

130001–130100 

|-bgcolor=#E9E9E9
| 130001 ||  || — || November 3, 1999 || Socorro || LINEAR || — || align=right | 2.8 km || 
|-id=002 bgcolor=#E9E9E9
| 130002 ||  || — || November 3, 1999 || Socorro || LINEAR || — || align=right | 4.5 km || 
|-id=003 bgcolor=#E9E9E9
| 130003 ||  || — || November 10, 1999 || Socorro || LINEAR || — || align=right | 1.6 km || 
|-id=004 bgcolor=#E9E9E9
| 130004 ||  || — || November 4, 1999 || Kitt Peak || Spacewatch || — || align=right | 1.4 km || 
|-id=005 bgcolor=#E9E9E9
| 130005 ||  || — || November 4, 1999 || Kitt Peak || Spacewatch || — || align=right | 3.7 km || 
|-id=006 bgcolor=#fefefe
| 130006 Imranaslam ||  ||  || November 4, 1999 || Catalina || CSS || — || align=right | 1.8 km || 
|-id=007 bgcolor=#E9E9E9
| 130007 Frankteti ||  ||  || November 4, 1999 || Catalina || CSS || — || align=right | 2.4 km || 
|-id=008 bgcolor=#fefefe
| 130008 ||  || — || November 3, 1999 || Socorro || LINEAR || H || align=right | 1.4 km || 
|-id=009 bgcolor=#E9E9E9
| 130009 ||  || — || November 3, 1999 || Socorro || LINEAR || — || align=right | 1.8 km || 
|-id=010 bgcolor=#fefefe
| 130010 ||  || — || November 3, 1999 || Socorro || LINEAR || H || align=right | 1.1 km || 
|-id=011 bgcolor=#E9E9E9
| 130011 ||  || — || November 4, 1999 || Socorro || LINEAR || — || align=right | 2.4 km || 
|-id=012 bgcolor=#E9E9E9
| 130012 ||  || — || November 4, 1999 || Socorro || LINEAR || — || align=right | 1.8 km || 
|-id=013 bgcolor=#E9E9E9
| 130013 ||  || — || November 4, 1999 || Socorro || LINEAR || — || align=right | 2.0 km || 
|-id=014 bgcolor=#E9E9E9
| 130014 ||  || — || November 4, 1999 || Socorro || LINEAR || — || align=right | 1.7 km || 
|-id=015 bgcolor=#E9E9E9
| 130015 ||  || — || November 4, 1999 || Socorro || LINEAR || HEN || align=right | 1.6 km || 
|-id=016 bgcolor=#E9E9E9
| 130016 ||  || — || November 4, 1999 || Socorro || LINEAR || — || align=right | 2.9 km || 
|-id=017 bgcolor=#E9E9E9
| 130017 ||  || — || November 4, 1999 || Socorro || LINEAR || — || align=right | 2.0 km || 
|-id=018 bgcolor=#E9E9E9
| 130018 ||  || — || November 4, 1999 || Socorro || LINEAR || — || align=right | 2.6 km || 
|-id=019 bgcolor=#E9E9E9
| 130019 ||  || — || November 4, 1999 || Socorro || LINEAR || — || align=right | 1.8 km || 
|-id=020 bgcolor=#E9E9E9
| 130020 ||  || — || November 4, 1999 || Socorro || LINEAR || — || align=right | 2.2 km || 
|-id=021 bgcolor=#E9E9E9
| 130021 ||  || — || November 5, 1999 || Kitt Peak || Spacewatch || — || align=right | 2.9 km || 
|-id=022 bgcolor=#d6d6d6
| 130022 ||  || — || November 5, 1999 || Kitt Peak || Spacewatch || KOR || align=right | 2.1 km || 
|-id=023 bgcolor=#d6d6d6
| 130023 ||  || — || November 3, 1999 || Socorro || LINEAR || — || align=right | 5.1 km || 
|-id=024 bgcolor=#E9E9E9
| 130024 ||  || — || November 4, 1999 || Socorro || LINEAR || — || align=right | 4.5 km || 
|-id=025 bgcolor=#E9E9E9
| 130025 ||  || — || November 4, 1999 || Socorro || LINEAR || — || align=right | 3.1 km || 
|-id=026 bgcolor=#fefefe
| 130026 ||  || — || November 6, 1999 || Kitt Peak || Spacewatch || — || align=right | 1.6 km || 
|-id=027 bgcolor=#E9E9E9
| 130027 ||  || — || November 3, 1999 || Socorro || LINEAR || — || align=right | 2.8 km || 
|-id=028 bgcolor=#E9E9E9
| 130028 ||  || — || November 5, 1999 || Socorro || LINEAR || — || align=right | 1.5 km || 
|-id=029 bgcolor=#E9E9E9
| 130029 ||  || — || November 9, 1999 || Socorro || LINEAR || INO || align=right | 2.1 km || 
|-id=030 bgcolor=#E9E9E9
| 130030 ||  || — || November 9, 1999 || Socorro || LINEAR || — || align=right | 2.5 km || 
|-id=031 bgcolor=#E9E9E9
| 130031 ||  || — || November 9, 1999 || Socorro || LINEAR || — || align=right | 1.6 km || 
|-id=032 bgcolor=#E9E9E9
| 130032 ||  || — || November 9, 1999 || Socorro || LINEAR || — || align=right | 5.0 km || 
|-id=033 bgcolor=#E9E9E9
| 130033 ||  || — || November 9, 1999 || Socorro || LINEAR || — || align=right | 4.0 km || 
|-id=034 bgcolor=#E9E9E9
| 130034 ||  || — || November 9, 1999 || Socorro || LINEAR || MRX || align=right | 2.1 km || 
|-id=035 bgcolor=#E9E9E9
| 130035 ||  || — || November 5, 1999 || Kitt Peak || Spacewatch || — || align=right | 1.9 km || 
|-id=036 bgcolor=#E9E9E9
| 130036 ||  || — || November 6, 1999 || Kitt Peak || Spacewatch || KON || align=right | 2.9 km || 
|-id=037 bgcolor=#E9E9E9
| 130037 ||  || — || November 6, 1999 || Kitt Peak || Spacewatch || — || align=right | 2.5 km || 
|-id=038 bgcolor=#E9E9E9
| 130038 ||  || — || November 9, 1999 || Kitt Peak || Spacewatch || HEN || align=right | 1.8 km || 
|-id=039 bgcolor=#E9E9E9
| 130039 ||  || — || November 12, 1999 || Socorro || LINEAR || — || align=right | 2.8 km || 
|-id=040 bgcolor=#E9E9E9
| 130040 ||  || — || November 12, 1999 || Socorro || LINEAR || — || align=right | 1.2 km || 
|-id=041 bgcolor=#E9E9E9
| 130041 ||  || — || November 10, 1999 || Kitt Peak || Spacewatch || ADE || align=right | 4.3 km || 
|-id=042 bgcolor=#E9E9E9
| 130042 ||  || — || November 12, 1999 || Socorro || LINEAR || EUN || align=right | 1.7 km || 
|-id=043 bgcolor=#E9E9E9
| 130043 ||  || — || November 14, 1999 || Socorro || LINEAR || — || align=right | 3.4 km || 
|-id=044 bgcolor=#E9E9E9
| 130044 ||  || — || November 14, 1999 || Socorro || LINEAR || WIT || align=right | 1.8 km || 
|-id=045 bgcolor=#E9E9E9
| 130045 ||  || — || November 14, 1999 || Socorro || LINEAR || — || align=right | 2.0 km || 
|-id=046 bgcolor=#E9E9E9
| 130046 ||  || — || November 14, 1999 || Socorro || LINEAR || MAR || align=right | 1.8 km || 
|-id=047 bgcolor=#E9E9E9
| 130047 ||  || — || November 14, 1999 || Socorro || LINEAR || — || align=right | 2.6 km || 
|-id=048 bgcolor=#E9E9E9
| 130048 ||  || — || November 14, 1999 || Socorro || LINEAR || MAR || align=right | 2.0 km || 
|-id=049 bgcolor=#E9E9E9
| 130049 ||  || — || November 14, 1999 || Socorro || LINEAR || — || align=right | 2.1 km || 
|-id=050 bgcolor=#E9E9E9
| 130050 ||  || — || November 14, 1999 || Socorro || LINEAR || — || align=right | 3.3 km || 
|-id=051 bgcolor=#fefefe
| 130051 ||  || — || November 14, 1999 || Socorro || LINEAR || — || align=right | 1.8 km || 
|-id=052 bgcolor=#E9E9E9
| 130052 ||  || — || November 14, 1999 || Socorro || LINEAR || XIZ || align=right | 2.1 km || 
|-id=053 bgcolor=#fefefe
| 130053 ||  || — || November 14, 1999 || Socorro || LINEAR || H || align=right | 1.0 km || 
|-id=054 bgcolor=#E9E9E9
| 130054 ||  || — || November 15, 1999 || Socorro || LINEAR || WIT || align=right | 1.7 km || 
|-id=055 bgcolor=#fefefe
| 130055 ||  || — || November 1, 1999 || Anderson Mesa || LONEOS || V || align=right | 1.6 km || 
|-id=056 bgcolor=#E9E9E9
| 130056 ||  || — || November 5, 1999 || Socorro || LINEAR || — || align=right | 2.1 km || 
|-id=057 bgcolor=#fefefe
| 130057 ||  || — || November 6, 1999 || Socorro || LINEAR || — || align=right | 2.5 km || 
|-id=058 bgcolor=#E9E9E9
| 130058 ||  || — || November 6, 1999 || Socorro || LINEAR || — || align=right | 5.2 km || 
|-id=059 bgcolor=#E9E9E9
| 130059 ||  || — || November 9, 1999 || Socorro || LINEAR || — || align=right | 2.7 km || 
|-id=060 bgcolor=#E9E9E9
| 130060 ||  || — || November 15, 1999 || Socorro || LINEAR || — || align=right | 2.9 km || 
|-id=061 bgcolor=#E9E9E9
| 130061 ||  || — || November 15, 1999 || Socorro || LINEAR || MIS || align=right | 4.2 km || 
|-id=062 bgcolor=#E9E9E9
| 130062 ||  || — || November 15, 1999 || Socorro || LINEAR || GEF || align=right | 2.8 km || 
|-id=063 bgcolor=#E9E9E9
| 130063 ||  || — || November 14, 1999 || Socorro || LINEAR || — || align=right | 2.2 km || 
|-id=064 bgcolor=#E9E9E9
| 130064 ||  || — || November 14, 1999 || Socorro || LINEAR || — || align=right | 2.1 km || 
|-id=065 bgcolor=#E9E9E9
| 130065 ||  || — || November 14, 1999 || Socorro || LINEAR || MAR || align=right | 2.3 km || 
|-id=066 bgcolor=#E9E9E9
| 130066 Timhaltigin ||  ||  || November 1, 1999 || Catalina || CSS || AER || align=right | 2.6 km || 
|-id=067 bgcolor=#E9E9E9
| 130067 Marius-Phaneuf ||  ||  || November 1, 1999 || Catalina || CSS || — || align=right | 2.2 km || 
|-id=068 bgcolor=#E9E9E9
| 130068 ||  || — || November 4, 1999 || Anderson Mesa || LONEOS || — || align=right | 6.0 km || 
|-id=069 bgcolor=#E9E9E9
| 130069 Danielgaudreau ||  ||  || November 1, 1999 || Catalina || CSS || — || align=right | 3.7 km || 
|-id=070 bgcolor=#E9E9E9
| 130070 ||  || — || November 3, 1999 || Anderson Mesa || LONEOS || MAR || align=right | 1.9 km || 
|-id=071 bgcolor=#E9E9E9
| 130071 Claudebrunet ||  ||  || November 3, 1999 || Catalina || CSS || — || align=right | 1.8 km || 
|-id=072 bgcolor=#d6d6d6
| 130072 Ilincaignat ||  ||  || November 3, 1999 || Catalina || CSS || TRP || align=right | 4.9 km || 
|-id=073 bgcolor=#fefefe
| 130073 ||  || — || November 9, 1999 || Anderson Mesa || LONEOS || — || align=right | 3.2 km || 
|-id=074 bgcolor=#E9E9E9
| 130074 ||  || — || November 11, 1999 || Kitt Peak || Spacewatch || — || align=right | 4.3 km || 
|-id=075 bgcolor=#fefefe
| 130075 ||  || — || November 5, 1999 || Socorro || LINEAR || V || align=right | 1.6 km || 
|-id=076 bgcolor=#E9E9E9
| 130076 ||  || — || November 5, 1999 || Socorro || LINEAR || HOF || align=right | 5.1 km || 
|-id=077 bgcolor=#E9E9E9
| 130077 ||  || — || November 5, 1999 || Socorro || LINEAR || — || align=right | 2.1 km || 
|-id=078 bgcolor=#E9E9E9
| 130078 Taschner ||  ||  || November 26, 1999 || Linz || E. Meyer || — || align=right | 1.5 km || 
|-id=079 bgcolor=#fefefe
| 130079 ||  || — || November 26, 1999 || Višnjan Observatory || K. Korlević || NYS || align=right | 1.9 km || 
|-id=080 bgcolor=#E9E9E9
| 130080 ||  || — || November 28, 1999 || Višnjan Observatory || K. Korlević || — || align=right | 2.6 km || 
|-id=081 bgcolor=#fefefe
| 130081 ||  || — || November 29, 1999 || Kitt Peak || Spacewatch || — || align=right | 1.7 km || 
|-id=082 bgcolor=#E9E9E9
| 130082 ||  || — || November 29, 1999 || Višnjan Observatory || K. Korlević || — || align=right | 6.9 km || 
|-id=083 bgcolor=#E9E9E9
| 130083 ||  || — || November 28, 1999 || Kitt Peak || Spacewatch || — || align=right | 4.7 km || 
|-id=084 bgcolor=#E9E9E9
| 130084 ||  || — || November 29, 1999 || Kitt Peak || Spacewatch || — || align=right | 2.1 km || 
|-id=085 bgcolor=#E9E9E9
| 130085 ||  || — || November 30, 1999 || Kitt Peak || Spacewatch || — || align=right | 4.5 km || 
|-id=086 bgcolor=#E9E9E9
| 130086 ||  || — || November 30, 1999 || Kitt Peak || Spacewatch || — || align=right | 1.5 km || 
|-id=087 bgcolor=#E9E9E9
| 130087 ||  || — || November 28, 1999 || Kitt Peak || Spacewatch || EUN || align=right | 2.1 km || 
|-id=088 bgcolor=#E9E9E9
| 130088 Grantcunningham ||  ||  || December 4, 1999 || Catalina || CSS || EUN || align=right | 2.1 km || 
|-id=089 bgcolor=#E9E9E9
| 130089 Saadatanwar ||  ||  || December 4, 1999 || Catalina || CSS || — || align=right | 4.3 km || 
|-id=090 bgcolor=#E9E9E9
| 130090 Heatherbowles ||  ||  || December 4, 1999 || Catalina || CSS || MAR || align=right | 1.7 km || 
|-id=091 bgcolor=#fefefe
| 130091 ||  || — || December 5, 1999 || Kitt Peak || Spacewatch || H || align=right | 1.5 km || 
|-id=092 bgcolor=#E9E9E9
| 130092 ||  || — || December 5, 1999 || Socorro || LINEAR || — || align=right | 3.1 km || 
|-id=093 bgcolor=#fefefe
| 130093 ||  || — || December 3, 1999 || Socorro || LINEAR || — || align=right | 4.5 km || 
|-id=094 bgcolor=#fefefe
| 130094 ||  || — || December 6, 1999 || Socorro || LINEAR || H || align=right | 1.0 km || 
|-id=095 bgcolor=#E9E9E9
| 130095 ||  || — || December 7, 1999 || Socorro || LINEAR || — || align=right | 6.0 km || 
|-id=096 bgcolor=#E9E9E9
| 130096 ||  || — || December 3, 1999 || Socorro || LINEAR || — || align=right | 1.7 km || 
|-id=097 bgcolor=#E9E9E9
| 130097 ||  || — || December 5, 1999 || Socorro || LINEAR || — || align=right | 4.5 km || 
|-id=098 bgcolor=#E9E9E9
| 130098 ||  || — || December 5, 1999 || Socorro || LINEAR || DOR || align=right | 5.1 km || 
|-id=099 bgcolor=#E9E9E9
| 130099 ||  || — || December 6, 1999 || Socorro || LINEAR || — || align=right | 4.7 km || 
|-id=100 bgcolor=#E9E9E9
| 130100 ||  || — || December 6, 1999 || Socorro || LINEAR || — || align=right | 4.9 km || 
|}

130101–130200 

|-bgcolor=#E9E9E9
| 130101 ||  || — || December 6, 1999 || Socorro || LINEAR || WAT || align=right | 4.1 km || 
|-id=102 bgcolor=#E9E9E9
| 130102 ||  || — || December 6, 1999 || Socorro || LINEAR || EUN || align=right | 2.8 km || 
|-id=103 bgcolor=#E9E9E9
| 130103 ||  || — || December 6, 1999 || Socorro || LINEAR || — || align=right | 4.4 km || 
|-id=104 bgcolor=#E9E9E9
| 130104 ||  || — || December 7, 1999 || Socorro || LINEAR || GEF || align=right | 2.4 km || 
|-id=105 bgcolor=#fefefe
| 130105 ||  || — || December 7, 1999 || Socorro || LINEAR || NYS || align=right | 1.3 km || 
|-id=106 bgcolor=#E9E9E9
| 130106 ||  || — || December 7, 1999 || Socorro || LINEAR || MAR || align=right | 3.1 km || 
|-id=107 bgcolor=#E9E9E9
| 130107 ||  || — || December 7, 1999 || Socorro || LINEAR || — || align=right | 1.6 km || 
|-id=108 bgcolor=#E9E9E9
| 130108 ||  || — || December 7, 1999 || Socorro || LINEAR || — || align=right | 2.5 km || 
|-id=109 bgcolor=#E9E9E9
| 130109 ||  || — || December 7, 1999 || Socorro || LINEAR || — || align=right | 2.8 km || 
|-id=110 bgcolor=#d6d6d6
| 130110 ||  || — || December 7, 1999 || Socorro || LINEAR || — || align=right | 3.1 km || 
|-id=111 bgcolor=#d6d6d6
| 130111 ||  || — || December 7, 1999 || Socorro || LINEAR || — || align=right | 4.9 km || 
|-id=112 bgcolor=#E9E9E9
| 130112 ||  || — || December 7, 1999 || Socorro || LINEAR || — || align=right | 4.5 km || 
|-id=113 bgcolor=#E9E9E9
| 130113 ||  || — || December 7, 1999 || Socorro || LINEAR || — || align=right | 2.3 km || 
|-id=114 bgcolor=#E9E9E9
| 130114 ||  || — || December 7, 1999 || Socorro || LINEAR || — || align=right | 4.1 km || 
|-id=115 bgcolor=#d6d6d6
| 130115 ||  || — || December 7, 1999 || Socorro || LINEAR || KOR || align=right | 2.6 km || 
|-id=116 bgcolor=#E9E9E9
| 130116 ||  || — || December 7, 1999 || Socorro || LINEAR || — || align=right | 2.7 km || 
|-id=117 bgcolor=#E9E9E9
| 130117 ||  || — || December 7, 1999 || Socorro || LINEAR || — || align=right | 4.4 km || 
|-id=118 bgcolor=#E9E9E9
| 130118 ||  || — || December 7, 1999 || Socorro || LINEAR || — || align=right | 3.5 km || 
|-id=119 bgcolor=#E9E9E9
| 130119 ||  || — || December 7, 1999 || Socorro || LINEAR || — || align=right | 2.9 km || 
|-id=120 bgcolor=#E9E9E9
| 130120 ||  || — || December 7, 1999 || Socorro || LINEAR || EUN || align=right | 3.0 km || 
|-id=121 bgcolor=#E9E9E9
| 130121 ||  || — || December 7, 1999 || Socorro || LINEAR || — || align=right | 7.9 km || 
|-id=122 bgcolor=#fefefe
| 130122 ||  || — || December 7, 1999 || Socorro || LINEAR || — || align=right | 3.5 km || 
|-id=123 bgcolor=#d6d6d6
| 130123 ||  || — || December 7, 1999 || Socorro || LINEAR || — || align=right | 4.7 km || 
|-id=124 bgcolor=#fefefe
| 130124 ||  || — || December 10, 1999 || Les Tardieux Obs. || M. Boeuf || H || align=right | 1.5 km || 
|-id=125 bgcolor=#E9E9E9
| 130125 ||  || — || December 11, 1999 || Oizumi || T. Kobayashi || — || align=right | 3.8 km || 
|-id=126 bgcolor=#E9E9E9
| 130126 Stillmanchase ||  ||  || December 4, 1999 || Catalina || CSS || — || align=right | 4.3 km || 
|-id=127 bgcolor=#E9E9E9
| 130127 Zoltanfarkas ||  ||  || December 4, 1999 || Catalina || CSS || — || align=right | 4.2 km || 
|-id=128 bgcolor=#d6d6d6
| 130128 Tarafisher ||  ||  || December 5, 1999 || Catalina || CSS || — || align=right | 5.1 km || 
|-id=129 bgcolor=#fefefe
| 130129 ||  || — || December 12, 1999 || Goodricke-Pigott || R. A. Tucker || H || align=right | 1.2 km || 
|-id=130 bgcolor=#E9E9E9
| 130130 ||  || — || December 12, 1999 || Socorro || LINEAR || EUN || align=right | 3.2 km || 
|-id=131 bgcolor=#E9E9E9
| 130131 ||  || — || December 12, 1999 || Socorro || LINEAR || ADE || align=right | 5.8 km || 
|-id=132 bgcolor=#E9E9E9
| 130132 ||  || — || December 12, 1999 || Socorro || LINEAR || — || align=right | 6.2 km || 
|-id=133 bgcolor=#fefefe
| 130133 ||  || — || December 3, 1999 || Socorro || LINEAR || H || align=right | 1.2 km || 
|-id=134 bgcolor=#fefefe
| 130134 ||  || — || December 8, 1999 || Socorro || LINEAR || H || align=right | 1.2 km || 
|-id=135 bgcolor=#fefefe
| 130135 ||  || — || December 13, 1999 || Socorro || LINEAR || H || align=right | 1.2 km || 
|-id=136 bgcolor=#E9E9E9
| 130136 ||  || — || December 3, 1999 || Anderson Mesa || LONEOS || — || align=right | 3.1 km || 
|-id=137 bgcolor=#E9E9E9
| 130137 ||  || — || December 11, 1999 || Uccle || T. Pauwels || RAF || align=right | 1.7 km || 
|-id=138 bgcolor=#E9E9E9
| 130138 ||  || — || December 7, 1999 || Kitt Peak || Spacewatch || AGN || align=right | 2.3 km || 
|-id=139 bgcolor=#d6d6d6
| 130139 ||  || — || December 7, 1999 || Kitt Peak || Spacewatch || — || align=right | 4.0 km || 
|-id=140 bgcolor=#E9E9E9
| 130140 ||  || — || December 8, 1999 || Kitt Peak || Spacewatch || RAF || align=right | 2.0 km || 
|-id=141 bgcolor=#E9E9E9
| 130141 ||  || — || December 8, 1999 || Socorro || LINEAR || — || align=right | 2.9 km || 
|-id=142 bgcolor=#E9E9E9
| 130142 ||  || — || December 8, 1999 || Socorro || LINEAR || — || align=right | 4.2 km || 
|-id=143 bgcolor=#E9E9E9
| 130143 ||  || — || December 10, 1999 || Socorro || LINEAR || RAF || align=right | 2.9 km || 
|-id=144 bgcolor=#E9E9E9
| 130144 ||  || — || December 12, 1999 || Socorro || LINEAR || EUN || align=right | 3.8 km || 
|-id=145 bgcolor=#E9E9E9
| 130145 ||  || — || December 12, 1999 || Socorro || LINEAR || RAF || align=right | 2.7 km || 
|-id=146 bgcolor=#d6d6d6
| 130146 ||  || — || December 12, 1999 || Socorro || LINEAR || — || align=right | 4.3 km || 
|-id=147 bgcolor=#E9E9E9
| 130147 ||  || — || December 12, 1999 || Socorro || LINEAR || — || align=right | 4.7 km || 
|-id=148 bgcolor=#E9E9E9
| 130148 ||  || — || December 12, 1999 || Socorro || LINEAR || — || align=right | 8.0 km || 
|-id=149 bgcolor=#E9E9E9
| 130149 ||  || — || December 12, 1999 || Socorro || LINEAR || — || align=right | 4.9 km || 
|-id=150 bgcolor=#E9E9E9
| 130150 ||  || — || December 12, 1999 || Socorro || LINEAR || — || align=right | 5.4 km || 
|-id=151 bgcolor=#E9E9E9
| 130151 ||  || — || December 13, 1999 || Socorro || LINEAR || MAR || align=right | 3.6 km || 
|-id=152 bgcolor=#E9E9E9
| 130152 ||  || — || December 14, 1999 || Socorro || LINEAR || — || align=right | 5.3 km || 
|-id=153 bgcolor=#E9E9E9
| 130153 ||  || — || December 13, 1999 || Kitt Peak || Spacewatch || — || align=right | 1.6 km || 
|-id=154 bgcolor=#fefefe
| 130154 ||  || — || December 14, 1999 || Socorro || LINEAR || — || align=right | 4.1 km || 
|-id=155 bgcolor=#d6d6d6
| 130155 ||  || — || December 15, 1999 || Socorro || LINEAR || ALA || align=right | 9.0 km || 
|-id=156 bgcolor=#d6d6d6
| 130156 ||  || — || December 13, 1999 || Kitt Peak || Spacewatch || KOR || align=right | 2.6 km || 
|-id=157 bgcolor=#E9E9E9
| 130157 ||  || — || December 14, 1999 || Kitt Peak || Spacewatch || — || align=right | 2.2 km || 
|-id=158 bgcolor=#d6d6d6
| 130158 Orsonjohn ||  ||  || December 7, 1999 || Catalina || CSS || — || align=right | 6.0 km || 
|-id=159 bgcolor=#E9E9E9
| 130159 ||  || — || December 2, 1999 || Anderson Mesa || LONEOS || — || align=right | 3.9 km || 
|-id=160 bgcolor=#d6d6d6
| 130160 ||  || — || December 2, 1999 || Kitt Peak || Spacewatch || — || align=right | 3.8 km || 
|-id=161 bgcolor=#d6d6d6
| 130161 Iankubik ||  ||  || December 5, 1999 || Catalina || CSS || — || align=right | 4.3 km || 
|-id=162 bgcolor=#fefefe
| 130162 || 1999 YM || — || December 16, 1999 || Socorro || LINEAR || H || align=right | 1.3 km || 
|-id=163 bgcolor=#fefefe
| 130163 ||  || — || December 29, 1999 || Socorro || LINEAR || H || align=right | 1.3 km || 
|-id=164 bgcolor=#E9E9E9
| 130164 ||  || — || December 27, 1999 || Kitt Peak || Spacewatch || — || align=right | 3.4 km || 
|-id=165 bgcolor=#E9E9E9
| 130165 ||  || — || December 27, 1999 || Kitt Peak || Spacewatch || — || align=right | 2.9 km || 
|-id=166 bgcolor=#d6d6d6
| 130166 ||  || — || December 31, 1999 || Kitt Peak || Spacewatch || THM || align=right | 2.9 km || 
|-id=167 bgcolor=#d6d6d6
| 130167 ||  || — || December 30, 1999 || Socorro || LINEAR || URS || align=right | 5.9 km || 
|-id=168 bgcolor=#E9E9E9
| 130168 ||  || — || December 30, 1999 || Socorro || LINEAR || — || align=right | 5.5 km || 
|-id=169 bgcolor=#fefefe
| 130169 ||  || — || January 2, 2000 || Socorro || LINEAR || PHO || align=right | 2.9 km || 
|-id=170 bgcolor=#d6d6d6
| 130170 ||  || — || January 3, 2000 || Kitt Peak || Spacewatch || EOS || align=right | 5.4 km || 
|-id=171 bgcolor=#d6d6d6
| 130171 ||  || — || January 2, 2000 || Socorro || LINEAR || — || align=right | 5.8 km || 
|-id=172 bgcolor=#E9E9E9
| 130172 ||  || — || January 2, 2000 || Socorro || LINEAR || GEF || align=right | 2.1 km || 
|-id=173 bgcolor=#E9E9E9
| 130173 ||  || — || January 3, 2000 || Socorro || LINEAR || — || align=right | 4.1 km || 
|-id=174 bgcolor=#E9E9E9
| 130174 ||  || — || January 3, 2000 || Socorro || LINEAR || — || align=right | 3.5 km || 
|-id=175 bgcolor=#d6d6d6
| 130175 ||  || — || January 3, 2000 || Socorro || LINEAR || — || align=right | 5.6 km || 
|-id=176 bgcolor=#d6d6d6
| 130176 ||  || — || January 3, 2000 || Socorro || LINEAR || — || align=right | 4.7 km || 
|-id=177 bgcolor=#E9E9E9
| 130177 ||  || — || January 3, 2000 || Socorro || LINEAR || — || align=right | 3.6 km || 
|-id=178 bgcolor=#E9E9E9
| 130178 ||  || — || January 3, 2000 || Socorro || LINEAR || — || align=right | 4.3 km || 
|-id=179 bgcolor=#E9E9E9
| 130179 ||  || — || January 5, 2000 || Kitt Peak || Spacewatch || — || align=right | 3.6 km || 
|-id=180 bgcolor=#E9E9E9
| 130180 ||  || — || January 4, 2000 || Socorro || LINEAR || — || align=right | 2.6 km || 
|-id=181 bgcolor=#d6d6d6
| 130181 ||  || — || January 4, 2000 || Socorro || LINEAR || BRA || align=right | 2.8 km || 
|-id=182 bgcolor=#d6d6d6
| 130182 ||  || — || January 4, 2000 || Socorro || LINEAR || — || align=right | 3.5 km || 
|-id=183 bgcolor=#d6d6d6
| 130183 ||  || — || January 4, 2000 || Socorro || LINEAR || — || align=right | 7.9 km || 
|-id=184 bgcolor=#d6d6d6
| 130184 ||  || — || January 4, 2000 || Socorro || LINEAR || — || align=right | 6.9 km || 
|-id=185 bgcolor=#d6d6d6
| 130185 ||  || — || January 4, 2000 || Socorro || LINEAR || — || align=right | 6.2 km || 
|-id=186 bgcolor=#d6d6d6
| 130186 ||  || — || January 5, 2000 || Socorro || LINEAR || — || align=right | 6.7 km || 
|-id=187 bgcolor=#E9E9E9
| 130187 ||  || — || January 5, 2000 || Socorro || LINEAR || — || align=right | 3.3 km || 
|-id=188 bgcolor=#E9E9E9
| 130188 ||  || — || January 5, 2000 || Socorro || LINEAR || EUN || align=right | 3.3 km || 
|-id=189 bgcolor=#d6d6d6
| 130189 ||  || — || January 5, 2000 || Socorro || LINEAR || — || align=right | 4.7 km || 
|-id=190 bgcolor=#C2FFFF
| 130190 ||  || — || January 5, 2000 || Socorro || LINEAR || L4 || align=right | 17 km || 
|-id=191 bgcolor=#fefefe
| 130191 ||  || — || January 2, 2000 || Socorro || LINEAR || H || align=right | 1.1 km || 
|-id=192 bgcolor=#fefefe
| 130192 ||  || — || January 3, 2000 || Socorro || LINEAR || H || align=right | 1.1 km || 
|-id=193 bgcolor=#d6d6d6
| 130193 ||  || — || January 4, 2000 || Socorro || LINEAR || — || align=right | 6.5 km || 
|-id=194 bgcolor=#d6d6d6
| 130194 ||  || — || January 5, 2000 || Socorro || LINEAR || — || align=right | 5.9 km || 
|-id=195 bgcolor=#E9E9E9
| 130195 ||  || — || January 5, 2000 || Socorro || LINEAR || RAF || align=right | 1.8 km || 
|-id=196 bgcolor=#d6d6d6
| 130196 ||  || — || January 4, 2000 || Socorro || LINEAR || — || align=right | 5.3 km || 
|-id=197 bgcolor=#fefefe
| 130197 ||  || — || January 8, 2000 || Socorro || LINEAR || H || align=right | 1.2 km || 
|-id=198 bgcolor=#fefefe
| 130198 ||  || — || January 8, 2000 || Socorro || LINEAR || H || align=right | 1.2 km || 
|-id=199 bgcolor=#d6d6d6
| 130199 ||  || — || January 3, 2000 || Socorro || LINEAR || — || align=right | 5.0 km || 
|-id=200 bgcolor=#d6d6d6
| 130200 ||  || — || January 8, 2000 || Socorro || LINEAR || — || align=right | 5.4 km || 
|}

130201–130300 

|-bgcolor=#E9E9E9
| 130201 ||  || — || January 7, 2000 || Socorro || LINEAR || MAR || align=right | 2.0 km || 
|-id=202 bgcolor=#E9E9E9
| 130202 ||  || — || January 7, 2000 || Socorro || LINEAR || — || align=right | 3.1 km || 
|-id=203 bgcolor=#E9E9E9
| 130203 ||  || — || January 7, 2000 || Socorro || LINEAR || — || align=right | 2.0 km || 
|-id=204 bgcolor=#E9E9E9
| 130204 ||  || — || January 7, 2000 || Socorro || LINEAR || — || align=right | 5.1 km || 
|-id=205 bgcolor=#d6d6d6
| 130205 ||  || — || January 7, 2000 || Socorro || LINEAR || — || align=right | 5.2 km || 
|-id=206 bgcolor=#fefefe
| 130206 ||  || — || January 9, 2000 || Socorro || LINEAR || H || align=right | 1.6 km || 
|-id=207 bgcolor=#d6d6d6
| 130207 ||  || — || January 15, 2000 || Višnjan Observatory || K. Korlević || — || align=right | 3.1 km || 
|-id=208 bgcolor=#d6d6d6
| 130208 ||  || — || January 5, 2000 || Kitt Peak || Spacewatch || — || align=right | 4.5 km || 
|-id=209 bgcolor=#E9E9E9
| 130209 ||  || — || January 7, 2000 || Kitt Peak || Spacewatch || — || align=right | 2.0 km || 
|-id=210 bgcolor=#E9E9E9
| 130210 ||  || — || January 8, 2000 || Kitt Peak || Spacewatch || — || align=right | 2.5 km || 
|-id=211 bgcolor=#d6d6d6
| 130211 ||  || — || January 8, 2000 || Kitt Peak || Spacewatch || EOS || align=right | 3.4 km || 
|-id=212 bgcolor=#d6d6d6
| 130212 ||  || — || January 8, 2000 || Kitt Peak || Spacewatch || — || align=right | 4.8 km || 
|-id=213 bgcolor=#E9E9E9
| 130213 ||  || — || January 9, 2000 || Kitt Peak || Spacewatch || HOF || align=right | 4.4 km || 
|-id=214 bgcolor=#d6d6d6
| 130214 ||  || — || January 10, 2000 || Kitt Peak || Spacewatch || THM || align=right | 2.6 km || 
|-id=215 bgcolor=#d6d6d6
| 130215 ||  || — || January 13, 2000 || Kitt Peak || Spacewatch || KOR || align=right | 2.7 km || 
|-id=216 bgcolor=#FA8072
| 130216 ||  || — || January 6, 2000 || Socorro || LINEAR || — || align=right | 2.8 km || 
|-id=217 bgcolor=#d6d6d6
| 130217 ||  || — || January 6, 2000 || Socorro || LINEAR || — || align=right | 4.4 km || 
|-id=218 bgcolor=#d6d6d6
| 130218 ||  || — || January 6, 2000 || Socorro || LINEAR || THM || align=right | 4.0 km || 
|-id=219 bgcolor=#d6d6d6
| 130219 ||  || — || January 7, 2000 || Anderson Mesa || LONEOS || — || align=right | 3.3 km || 
|-id=220 bgcolor=#E9E9E9
| 130220 ||  || — || January 9, 2000 || Socorro || LINEAR || — || align=right | 6.6 km || 
|-id=221 bgcolor=#E9E9E9
| 130221 ||  || — || January 2, 2000 || Kitt Peak || Spacewatch || AST || align=right | 2.2 km || 
|-id=222 bgcolor=#d6d6d6
| 130222 || 2000 BM || — || January 24, 2000 || Višnjan Observatory || K. Korlević || — || align=right | 5.3 km || 
|-id=223 bgcolor=#d6d6d6
| 130223 ||  || — || January 27, 2000 || Kitt Peak || Spacewatch || — || align=right | 4.6 km || 
|-id=224 bgcolor=#d6d6d6
| 130224 ||  || — || January 29, 2000 || Socorro || LINEAR || KOR || align=right | 2.8 km || 
|-id=225 bgcolor=#d6d6d6
| 130225 ||  || — || January 25, 2000 || Bergisch Gladbach || W. Bickel || — || align=right | 2.8 km || 
|-id=226 bgcolor=#E9E9E9
| 130226 ||  || — || January 28, 2000 || Kitt Peak || Spacewatch || — || align=right | 3.7 km || 
|-id=227 bgcolor=#d6d6d6
| 130227 ||  || — || January 30, 2000 || Kitt Peak || Spacewatch || 7:4 || align=right | 5.1 km || 
|-id=228 bgcolor=#d6d6d6
| 130228 ||  || — || January 28, 2000 || Kitt Peak || Spacewatch || THM || align=right | 3.8 km || 
|-id=229 bgcolor=#d6d6d6
| 130229 Igorlazbin ||  ||  || January 30, 2000 || Catalina || CSS || THM || align=right | 4.5 km || 
|-id=230 bgcolor=#d6d6d6
| 130230 ||  || — || January 27, 2000 || Kitt Peak || Spacewatch || KOR || align=right | 2.4 km || 
|-id=231 bgcolor=#E9E9E9
| 130231 ||  || — || January 27, 2000 || Kitt Peak || Spacewatch || MRX || align=right | 1.8 km || 
|-id=232 bgcolor=#d6d6d6
| 130232 ||  || — || January 16, 2000 || Kitt Peak || Spacewatch || KAR || align=right | 1.7 km || 
|-id=233 bgcolor=#fefefe
| 130233 ||  || — || February 2, 2000 || Socorro || LINEAR || H || align=right data-sort-value="0.97" | 970 m || 
|-id=234 bgcolor=#d6d6d6
| 130234 ||  || — || February 2, 2000 || Socorro || LINEAR || VER || align=right | 6.4 km || 
|-id=235 bgcolor=#d6d6d6
| 130235 ||  || — || February 2, 2000 || Socorro || LINEAR || — || align=right | 3.7 km || 
|-id=236 bgcolor=#d6d6d6
| 130236 ||  || — || February 2, 2000 || Socorro || LINEAR || EUP || align=right | 8.1 km || 
|-id=237 bgcolor=#d6d6d6
| 130237 ||  || — || February 2, 2000 || Socorro || LINEAR || — || align=right | 4.4 km || 
|-id=238 bgcolor=#d6d6d6
| 130238 ||  || — || February 2, 2000 || Socorro || LINEAR || THM || align=right | 3.1 km || 
|-id=239 bgcolor=#d6d6d6
| 130239 ||  || — || February 2, 2000 || Socorro || LINEAR || EUP || align=right | 7.6 km || 
|-id=240 bgcolor=#d6d6d6
| 130240 ||  || — || February 6, 2000 || Prescott || P. G. Comba || HYG || align=right | 5.0 km || 
|-id=241 bgcolor=#d6d6d6
| 130241 ||  || — || February 10, 2000 || Kitt Peak || Spacewatch || — || align=right | 3.9 km || 
|-id=242 bgcolor=#d6d6d6
| 130242 ||  || — || February 2, 2000 || Socorro || LINEAR || — || align=right | 6.7 km || 
|-id=243 bgcolor=#fefefe
| 130243 ||  || — || February 6, 2000 || Socorro || LINEAR || H || align=right | 1.5 km || 
|-id=244 bgcolor=#d6d6d6
| 130244 ||  || — || February 4, 2000 || Višnjan Observatory || K. Korlević || — || align=right | 6.1 km || 
|-id=245 bgcolor=#d6d6d6
| 130245 ||  || — || February 8, 2000 || Prescott || P. G. Comba || — || align=right | 5.9 km || 
|-id=246 bgcolor=#d6d6d6
| 130246 ||  || — || February 4, 2000 || Socorro || LINEAR || EUP || align=right | 7.5 km || 
|-id=247 bgcolor=#d6d6d6
| 130247 ||  || — || February 4, 2000 || Socorro || LINEAR || — || align=right | 5.3 km || 
|-id=248 bgcolor=#d6d6d6
| 130248 ||  || — || February 6, 2000 || Socorro || LINEAR || — || align=right | 5.9 km || 
|-id=249 bgcolor=#d6d6d6
| 130249 Markminer ||  ||  || February 5, 2000 || Catalina || CSS || IMH || align=right | 6.4 km || 
|-id=250 bgcolor=#d6d6d6
| 130250 ||  || — || February 3, 2000 || Socorro || LINEAR || VER || align=right | 6.3 km || 
|-id=251 bgcolor=#d6d6d6
| 130251 ||  || — || February 11, 2000 || Socorro || LINEAR || — || align=right | 4.9 km || 
|-id=252 bgcolor=#d6d6d6
| 130252 ||  || — || February 4, 2000 || Kitt Peak || Spacewatch || — || align=right | 3.3 km || 
|-id=253 bgcolor=#d6d6d6
| 130253 ||  || — || February 27, 2000 || Kitt Peak || Spacewatch || — || align=right | 3.7 km || 
|-id=254 bgcolor=#d6d6d6
| 130254 ||  || — || February 28, 2000 || Kitt Peak || Spacewatch || — || align=right | 6.0 km || 
|-id=255 bgcolor=#d6d6d6
| 130255 ||  || — || February 29, 2000 || Socorro || LINEAR || — || align=right | 4.4 km || 
|-id=256 bgcolor=#d6d6d6
| 130256 ||  || — || February 29, 2000 || Socorro || LINEAR || LIX || align=right | 6.1 km || 
|-id=257 bgcolor=#d6d6d6
| 130257 ||  || — || February 29, 2000 || Socorro || LINEAR || EOS || align=right | 3.9 km || 
|-id=258 bgcolor=#d6d6d6
| 130258 ||  || — || February 29, 2000 || Socorro || LINEAR || — || align=right | 6.4 km || 
|-id=259 bgcolor=#d6d6d6
| 130259 ||  || — || February 29, 2000 || Socorro || LINEAR || HYG || align=right | 4.4 km || 
|-id=260 bgcolor=#d6d6d6
| 130260 ||  || — || February 29, 2000 || Socorro || LINEAR || — || align=right | 7.5 km || 
|-id=261 bgcolor=#d6d6d6
| 130261 ||  || — || February 29, 2000 || Socorro || LINEAR || — || align=right | 5.1 km || 
|-id=262 bgcolor=#d6d6d6
| 130262 ||  || — || February 29, 2000 || Socorro || LINEAR || — || align=right | 6.5 km || 
|-id=263 bgcolor=#d6d6d6
| 130263 ||  || — || February 29, 2000 || Socorro || LINEAR || HYG || align=right | 5.5 km || 
|-id=264 bgcolor=#E9E9E9
| 130264 ||  || — || February 29, 2000 || Socorro || LINEAR || — || align=right | 5.1 km || 
|-id=265 bgcolor=#d6d6d6
| 130265 ||  || — || February 29, 2000 || Socorro || LINEAR || — || align=right | 5.1 km || 
|-id=266 bgcolor=#E9E9E9
| 130266 ||  || — || February 29, 2000 || Socorro || LINEAR || — || align=right | 3.2 km || 
|-id=267 bgcolor=#E9E9E9
| 130267 ||  || — || February 29, 2000 || Socorro || LINEAR || — || align=right | 4.2 km || 
|-id=268 bgcolor=#d6d6d6
| 130268 ||  || — || February 29, 2000 || Socorro || LINEAR || EOS || align=right | 4.0 km || 
|-id=269 bgcolor=#d6d6d6
| 130269 ||  || — || February 29, 2000 || Socorro || LINEAR || THM || align=right | 5.0 km || 
|-id=270 bgcolor=#d6d6d6
| 130270 ||  || — || February 29, 2000 || Socorro || LINEAR || — || align=right | 5.9 km || 
|-id=271 bgcolor=#d6d6d6
| 130271 ||  || — || February 29, 2000 || Socorro || LINEAR || — || align=right | 5.1 km || 
|-id=272 bgcolor=#d6d6d6
| 130272 ||  || — || February 29, 2000 || Socorro || LINEAR || THM || align=right | 5.2 km || 
|-id=273 bgcolor=#d6d6d6
| 130273 ||  || — || February 29, 2000 || Socorro || LINEAR || — || align=right | 3.6 km || 
|-id=274 bgcolor=#d6d6d6
| 130274 ||  || — || February 29, 2000 || Socorro || LINEAR || — || align=right | 4.5 km || 
|-id=275 bgcolor=#d6d6d6
| 130275 ||  || — || February 29, 2000 || Socorro || LINEAR || — || align=right | 4.7 km || 
|-id=276 bgcolor=#fefefe
| 130276 ||  || — || February 29, 2000 || Socorro || LINEAR || — || align=right | 1.2 km || 
|-id=277 bgcolor=#d6d6d6
| 130277 ||  || — || February 28, 2000 || Socorro || LINEAR || HYG || align=right | 5.5 km || 
|-id=278 bgcolor=#d6d6d6
| 130278 ||  || — || February 28, 2000 || Socorro || LINEAR || — || align=right | 5.1 km || 
|-id=279 bgcolor=#d6d6d6
| 130279 ||  || — || February 29, 2000 || Socorro || LINEAR || — || align=right | 7.9 km || 
|-id=280 bgcolor=#d6d6d6
| 130280 ||  || — || February 29, 2000 || Socorro || LINEAR || — || align=right | 5.5 km || 
|-id=281 bgcolor=#d6d6d6
| 130281 || 2000 EM || — || March 2, 2000 || Prescott || P. G. Comba || HYG || align=right | 4.7 km || 
|-id=282 bgcolor=#d6d6d6
| 130282 ||  || — || March 3, 2000 || Socorro || LINEAR || KOR || align=right | 2.5 km || 
|-id=283 bgcolor=#d6d6d6
| 130283 Elizabethgraham ||  ||  || March 4, 2000 || Lake Tekapo || N. Brady || URS || align=right | 5.7 km || 
|-id=284 bgcolor=#d6d6d6
| 130284 ||  || — || March 3, 2000 || Socorro || LINEAR || — || align=right | 3.9 km || 
|-id=285 bgcolor=#d6d6d6
| 130285 ||  || — || March 5, 2000 || Socorro || LINEAR || EOS || align=right | 3.9 km || 
|-id=286 bgcolor=#d6d6d6
| 130286 ||  || — || March 3, 2000 || Kitt Peak || Spacewatch || — || align=right | 3.9 km || 
|-id=287 bgcolor=#d6d6d6
| 130287 ||  || — || March 4, 2000 || Socorro || LINEAR || — || align=right | 7.4 km || 
|-id=288 bgcolor=#d6d6d6
| 130288 ||  || — || March 8, 2000 || Socorro || LINEAR || — || align=right | 3.6 km || 
|-id=289 bgcolor=#d6d6d6
| 130289 ||  || — || March 3, 2000 || Socorro || LINEAR || KOR || align=right | 3.1 km || 
|-id=290 bgcolor=#d6d6d6
| 130290 ||  || — || March 8, 2000 || Socorro || LINEAR || — || align=right | 4.2 km || 
|-id=291 bgcolor=#d6d6d6
| 130291 ||  || — || March 8, 2000 || Socorro || LINEAR || THM || align=right | 6.1 km || 
|-id=292 bgcolor=#d6d6d6
| 130292 ||  || — || March 8, 2000 || Socorro || LINEAR || VER || align=right | 5.3 km || 
|-id=293 bgcolor=#d6d6d6
| 130293 ||  || — || March 9, 2000 || Socorro || LINEAR || — || align=right | 5.0 km || 
|-id=294 bgcolor=#d6d6d6
| 130294 ||  || — || March 9, 2000 || Socorro || LINEAR || THM || align=right | 4.1 km || 
|-id=295 bgcolor=#d6d6d6
| 130295 ||  || — || March 10, 2000 || Socorro || LINEAR || 2:1J || align=right | 4.3 km || 
|-id=296 bgcolor=#d6d6d6
| 130296 ||  || — || March 10, 2000 || Socorro || LINEAR || THM || align=right | 3.8 km || 
|-id=297 bgcolor=#d6d6d6
| 130297 ||  || — || March 10, 2000 || Socorro || LINEAR || EUP || align=right | 8.9 km || 
|-id=298 bgcolor=#d6d6d6
| 130298 ||  || — || March 10, 2000 || Socorro || LINEAR || — || align=right | 8.7 km || 
|-id=299 bgcolor=#d6d6d6
| 130299 ||  || — || March 10, 2000 || Socorro || LINEAR || — || align=right | 6.2 km || 
|-id=300 bgcolor=#d6d6d6
| 130300 ||  || — || March 10, 2000 || Socorro || LINEAR || EOS || align=right | 6.7 km || 
|}

130301–130400 

|-bgcolor=#d6d6d6
| 130301 ||  || — || March 9, 2000 || Kitt Peak || Spacewatch || — || align=right | 4.4 km || 
|-id=302 bgcolor=#d6d6d6
| 130302 ||  || — || March 5, 2000 || Socorro || LINEAR || — || align=right | 4.6 km || 
|-id=303 bgcolor=#d6d6d6
| 130303 ||  || — || March 5, 2000 || Socorro || LINEAR || — || align=right | 7.3 km || 
|-id=304 bgcolor=#d6d6d6
| 130304 ||  || — || March 5, 2000 || Socorro || LINEAR || — || align=right | 8.0 km || 
|-id=305 bgcolor=#d6d6d6
| 130305 ||  || — || March 9, 2000 || Socorro || LINEAR || — || align=right | 3.9 km || 
|-id=306 bgcolor=#d6d6d6
| 130306 ||  || — || March 12, 2000 || Socorro || LINEAR || — || align=right | 5.8 km || 
|-id=307 bgcolor=#E9E9E9
| 130307 ||  || — || March 14, 2000 || Kitt Peak || Spacewatch || — || align=right | 2.0 km || 
|-id=308 bgcolor=#d6d6d6
| 130308 ||  || — || March 9, 2000 || Socorro || LINEAR || — || align=right | 7.5 km || 
|-id=309 bgcolor=#d6d6d6
| 130309 ||  || — || March 12, 2000 || Socorro || LINEAR || — || align=right | 8.5 km || 
|-id=310 bgcolor=#d6d6d6
| 130310 ||  || — || March 12, 2000 || Socorro || LINEAR || TIR || align=right | 7.0 km || 
|-id=311 bgcolor=#d6d6d6
| 130311 ||  || — || March 11, 2000 || Anderson Mesa || LONEOS || EUP || align=right | 8.8 km || 
|-id=312 bgcolor=#d6d6d6
| 130312 ||  || — || March 8, 2000 || Socorro || LINEAR || — || align=right | 7.1 km || 
|-id=313 bgcolor=#d6d6d6
| 130313 ||  || — || March 11, 2000 || Anderson Mesa || LONEOS || HYG || align=right | 5.7 km || 
|-id=314 bgcolor=#d6d6d6
| 130314 Williamodonnell ||  ||  || March 11, 2000 || Catalina || CSS || — || align=right | 7.0 km || 
|-id=315 bgcolor=#d6d6d6
| 130315 ||  || — || March 11, 2000 || Socorro || LINEAR || — || align=right | 5.1 km || 
|-id=316 bgcolor=#d6d6d6
| 130316 ||  || — || March 11, 2000 || Anderson Mesa || LONEOS || THM || align=right | 6.9 km || 
|-id=317 bgcolor=#d6d6d6
| 130317 ||  || — || March 11, 2000 || Anderson Mesa || LONEOS || HYG || align=right | 6.2 km || 
|-id=318 bgcolor=#d6d6d6
| 130318 ||  || — || March 11, 2000 || Anderson Mesa || LONEOS || — || align=right | 5.0 km || 
|-id=319 bgcolor=#d6d6d6
| 130319 Danielpelham ||  ||  || March 2, 2000 || Catalina || CSS || — || align=right | 5.7 km || 
|-id=320 bgcolor=#d6d6d6
| 130320 Maherrassas ||  ||  || March 2, 2000 || Catalina || CSS || THM || align=right | 5.4 km || 
|-id=321 bgcolor=#d6d6d6
| 130321 ||  || — || March 3, 2000 || Socorro || LINEAR || — || align=right | 7.2 km || 
|-id=322 bgcolor=#fefefe
| 130322 ||  || — || March 4, 2000 || Socorro || LINEAR || H || align=right | 1.9 km || 
|-id=323 bgcolor=#d6d6d6
| 130323 ||  || — || March 4, 2000 || Socorro || LINEAR || — || align=right | 4.8 km || 
|-id=324 bgcolor=#d6d6d6
| 130324 ||  || — || March 5, 2000 || Socorro || LINEAR || Tj (2.97) || align=right | 8.4 km || 
|-id=325 bgcolor=#d6d6d6
| 130325 ||  || — || March 4, 2000 || Socorro || LINEAR || — || align=right | 7.7 km || 
|-id=326 bgcolor=#d6d6d6
| 130326 ||  || — || March 5, 2000 || Socorro || LINEAR || — || align=right | 4.7 km || 
|-id=327 bgcolor=#d6d6d6
| 130327 ||  || — || March 3, 2000 || Socorro || LINEAR || — || align=right | 3.9 km || 
|-id=328 bgcolor=#d6d6d6
| 130328 ||  || — || March 27, 2000 || Kitt Peak || Spacewatch || — || align=right | 4.6 km || 
|-id=329 bgcolor=#d6d6d6
| 130329 ||  || — || March 28, 2000 || Socorro || LINEAR || — || align=right | 7.6 km || 
|-id=330 bgcolor=#d6d6d6
| 130330 ||  || — || March 28, 2000 || Socorro || LINEAR || LIX || align=right | 7.8 km || 
|-id=331 bgcolor=#d6d6d6
| 130331 ||  || — || March 30, 2000 || Kitt Peak || Spacewatch || THM || align=right | 4.4 km || 
|-id=332 bgcolor=#d6d6d6
| 130332 ||  || — || March 29, 2000 || Socorro || LINEAR || EUP || align=right | 7.2 km || 
|-id=333 bgcolor=#d6d6d6
| 130333 ||  || — || March 29, 2000 || Socorro || LINEAR || — || align=right | 7.4 km || 
|-id=334 bgcolor=#d6d6d6
| 130334 ||  || — || March 29, 2000 || Socorro || LINEAR || Tj (2.98) || align=right | 8.1 km || 
|-id=335 bgcolor=#d6d6d6
| 130335 ||  || — || March 27, 2000 || Anderson Mesa || LONEOS || — || align=right | 5.0 km || 
|-id=336 bgcolor=#d6d6d6
| 130336 ||  || — || March 27, 2000 || Anderson Mesa || LONEOS || EUP || align=right | 6.6 km || 
|-id=337 bgcolor=#d6d6d6
| 130337 ||  || — || March 27, 2000 || Anderson Mesa || LONEOS || — || align=right | 5.6 km || 
|-id=338 bgcolor=#d6d6d6
| 130338 ||  || — || March 29, 2000 || Socorro || LINEAR || — || align=right | 7.9 km || 
|-id=339 bgcolor=#d6d6d6
| 130339 ||  || — || March 29, 2000 || Socorro || LINEAR || — || align=right | 7.7 km || 
|-id=340 bgcolor=#d6d6d6
| 130340 ||  || — || March 29, 2000 || Socorro || LINEAR || — || align=right | 5.3 km || 
|-id=341 bgcolor=#d6d6d6
| 130341 ||  || — || March 29, 2000 || Socorro || LINEAR || — || align=right | 5.4 km || 
|-id=342 bgcolor=#d6d6d6
| 130342 ||  || — || March 30, 2000 || Kitt Peak || Spacewatch || 7:4 || align=right | 6.4 km || 
|-id=343 bgcolor=#d6d6d6
| 130343 ||  || — || March 29, 2000 || Socorro || LINEAR || TIR || align=right | 4.8 km || 
|-id=344 bgcolor=#d6d6d6
| 130344 ||  || — || March 26, 2000 || Anderson Mesa || LONEOS || EOS || align=right | 3.7 km || 
|-id=345 bgcolor=#d6d6d6
| 130345 ||  || — || March 26, 2000 || Anderson Mesa || LONEOS || — || align=right | 3.6 km || 
|-id=346 bgcolor=#d6d6d6
| 130346 ||  || — || March 29, 2000 || Socorro || LINEAR || — || align=right | 4.6 km || 
|-id=347 bgcolor=#d6d6d6
| 130347 ||  || — || March 29, 2000 || Socorro || LINEAR || VER || align=right | 5.5 km || 
|-id=348 bgcolor=#d6d6d6
| 130348 ||  || — || March 25, 2000 || Kitt Peak || Spacewatch || THM || align=right | 2.5 km || 
|-id=349 bgcolor=#d6d6d6
| 130349 ||  || — || March 26, 2000 || Anderson Mesa || LONEOS || — || align=right | 5.6 km || 
|-id=350 bgcolor=#fefefe
| 130350 ||  || — || April 5, 2000 || Socorro || LINEAR || H || align=right | 1.5 km || 
|-id=351 bgcolor=#d6d6d6
| 130351 ||  || — || April 5, 2000 || Socorro || LINEAR || — || align=right | 6.6 km || 
|-id=352 bgcolor=#d6d6d6
| 130352 ||  || — || April 5, 2000 || Socorro || LINEAR || — || align=right | 5.7 km || 
|-id=353 bgcolor=#d6d6d6
| 130353 ||  || — || April 5, 2000 || Socorro || LINEAR || HYG || align=right | 5.2 km || 
|-id=354 bgcolor=#d6d6d6
| 130354 ||  || — || April 5, 2000 || Socorro || LINEAR || — || align=right | 4.8 km || 
|-id=355 bgcolor=#d6d6d6
| 130355 ||  || — || April 5, 2000 || Socorro || LINEAR || VER || align=right | 6.1 km || 
|-id=356 bgcolor=#d6d6d6
| 130356 ||  || — || April 5, 2000 || Socorro || LINEAR || — || align=right | 6.0 km || 
|-id=357 bgcolor=#d6d6d6
| 130357 ||  || — || April 5, 2000 || Socorro || LINEAR || — || align=right | 4.7 km || 
|-id=358 bgcolor=#d6d6d6
| 130358 ||  || — || April 5, 2000 || Socorro || LINEAR || URS || align=right | 6.9 km || 
|-id=359 bgcolor=#d6d6d6
| 130359 ||  || — || April 5, 2000 || Socorro || LINEAR || — || align=right | 9.5 km || 
|-id=360 bgcolor=#d6d6d6
| 130360 ||  || — || April 5, 2000 || Socorro || LINEAR || VER || align=right | 5.6 km || 
|-id=361 bgcolor=#d6d6d6
| 130361 ||  || — || April 4, 2000 || Socorro || LINEAR || — || align=right | 5.8 km || 
|-id=362 bgcolor=#d6d6d6
| 130362 ||  || — || April 4, 2000 || Socorro || LINEAR || LIX || align=right | 9.5 km || 
|-id=363 bgcolor=#d6d6d6
| 130363 ||  || — || April 5, 2000 || Socorro || LINEAR || — || align=right | 6.9 km || 
|-id=364 bgcolor=#d6d6d6
| 130364 ||  || — || April 7, 2000 || Socorro || LINEAR || EOS || align=right | 6.7 km || 
|-id=365 bgcolor=#d6d6d6
| 130365 ||  || — || April 7, 2000 || Socorro || LINEAR || — || align=right | 4.5 km || 
|-id=366 bgcolor=#d6d6d6
| 130366 ||  || — || April 2, 2000 || Kitt Peak || Spacewatch || — || align=right | 4.1 km || 
|-id=367 bgcolor=#d6d6d6
| 130367 ||  || — || April 3, 2000 || Kitt Peak || Spacewatch || — || align=right | 4.7 km || 
|-id=368 bgcolor=#d6d6d6
| 130368 ||  || — || April 5, 2000 || Kitt Peak || Spacewatch || THM || align=right | 4.8 km || 
|-id=369 bgcolor=#d6d6d6
| 130369 ||  || — || April 7, 2000 || Socorro || LINEAR || Tj (2.99) || align=right | 9.6 km || 
|-id=370 bgcolor=#d6d6d6
| 130370 ||  || — || April 5, 2000 || Kitt Peak || Spacewatch || — || align=right | 2.5 km || 
|-id=371 bgcolor=#d6d6d6
| 130371 ||  || — || April 5, 2000 || Socorro || LINEAR || EOS || align=right | 6.5 km || 
|-id=372 bgcolor=#d6d6d6
| 130372 ||  || — || April 5, 2000 || Socorro || LINEAR || — || align=right | 3.0 km || 
|-id=373 bgcolor=#d6d6d6
| 130373 ||  || — || April 6, 2000 || Socorro || LINEAR || — || align=right | 5.9 km || 
|-id=374 bgcolor=#d6d6d6
| 130374 ||  || — || April 12, 2000 || Haleakala || NEAT || — || align=right | 4.1 km || 
|-id=375 bgcolor=#d6d6d6
| 130375 ||  || — || April 5, 2000 || Anderson Mesa || LONEOS || — || align=right | 5.9 km || 
|-id=376 bgcolor=#d6d6d6
| 130376 ||  || — || April 2, 2000 || Anderson Mesa || LONEOS || HYG || align=right | 6.7 km || 
|-id=377 bgcolor=#d6d6d6
| 130377 ||  || — || April 3, 2000 || Kitt Peak || Spacewatch || VER || align=right | 4.2 km || 
|-id=378 bgcolor=#d6d6d6
| 130378 || 2000 HR || — || April 24, 2000 || Kitt Peak || Spacewatch || HYG || align=right | 5.2 km || 
|-id=379 bgcolor=#d6d6d6
| 130379 ||  || — || April 29, 2000 || Socorro || LINEAR || 7:4 || align=right | 9.2 km || 
|-id=380 bgcolor=#d6d6d6
| 130380 ||  || — || April 30, 2000 || Socorro || LINEAR || — || align=right | 4.6 km || 
|-id=381 bgcolor=#d6d6d6
| 130381 ||  || — || April 27, 2000 || Socorro || LINEAR || — || align=right | 6.0 km || 
|-id=382 bgcolor=#d6d6d6
| 130382 ||  || — || April 25, 2000 || Anderson Mesa || LONEOS || 7:4 || align=right | 6.2 km || 
|-id=383 bgcolor=#fefefe
| 130383 ||  || — || April 25, 2000 || Anderson Mesa || LONEOS || — || align=right | 1.1 km || 
|-id=384 bgcolor=#d6d6d6
| 130384 ||  || — || April 27, 2000 || Socorro || LINEAR || EUP || align=right | 8.0 km || 
|-id=385 bgcolor=#d6d6d6
| 130385 ||  || — || May 7, 2000 || Socorro || LINEAR || 7:4 || align=right | 5.4 km || 
|-id=386 bgcolor=#FA8072
| 130386 ||  || — || May 7, 2000 || Socorro || LINEAR || — || align=right | 2.1 km || 
|-id=387 bgcolor=#fefefe
| 130387 ||  || — || May 7, 2000 || Socorro || LINEAR || — || align=right | 1.3 km || 
|-id=388 bgcolor=#d6d6d6
| 130388 ||  || — || May 1, 2000 || Haleakala || NEAT || TIR || align=right | 5.1 km || 
|-id=389 bgcolor=#d6d6d6
| 130389 ||  || — || May 1, 2000 || Anderson Mesa || LONEOS || — || align=right | 3.3 km || 
|-id=390 bgcolor=#d6d6d6
| 130390 ||  || — || May 1, 2000 || Anderson Mesa || LONEOS || — || align=right | 7.1 km || 
|-id=391 bgcolor=#C2E0FF
| 130391 ||  || — || May 6, 2000 || La Silla || La Silla Obs. || twotinocritical || align=right | 111 km || 
|-id=392 bgcolor=#d6d6d6
| 130392 ||  || — || May 25, 2000 || Anderson Mesa || LONEOS || — || align=right | 6.5 km || 
|-id=393 bgcolor=#d6d6d6
| 130393 ||  || — || May 30, 2000 || Socorro || LINEAR || — || align=right | 8.3 km || 
|-id=394 bgcolor=#fefefe
| 130394 ||  || — || June 7, 2000 || Socorro || LINEAR || — || align=right | 1.3 km || 
|-id=395 bgcolor=#FA8072
| 130395 ||  || — || June 11, 2000 || Socorro || LINEAR || — || align=right | 2.6 km || 
|-id=396 bgcolor=#fefefe
| 130396 ||  || — || June 6, 2000 || Anderson Mesa || LONEOS || — || align=right | 1.6 km || 
|-id=397 bgcolor=#fefefe
| 130397 ||  || — || June 5, 2000 || Anderson Mesa || LONEOS || — || align=right | 1.7 km || 
|-id=398 bgcolor=#fefefe
| 130398 ||  || — || July 5, 2000 || Kitt Peak || Spacewatch || — || align=right | 2.0 km || 
|-id=399 bgcolor=#fefefe
| 130399 ||  || — || July 5, 2000 || Anderson Mesa || LONEOS || — || align=right | 3.2 km || 
|-id=400 bgcolor=#fefefe
| 130400 ||  || — || July 5, 2000 || Anderson Mesa || LONEOS || FLO || align=right | 1.2 km || 
|}

130401–130500 

|-bgcolor=#fefefe
| 130401 ||  || — || July 5, 2000 || Anderson Mesa || LONEOS || — || align=right | 1.6 km || 
|-id=402 bgcolor=#fefefe
| 130402 ||  || — || July 29, 2000 || Socorro || LINEAR || — || align=right | 2.2 km || 
|-id=403 bgcolor=#fefefe
| 130403 ||  || — || July 23, 2000 || Socorro || LINEAR || — || align=right | 1.8 km || 
|-id=404 bgcolor=#fefefe
| 130404 ||  || — || July 23, 2000 || Socorro || LINEAR || — || align=right | 1.8 km || 
|-id=405 bgcolor=#fefefe
| 130405 ||  || — || July 23, 2000 || Socorro || LINEAR || — || align=right | 1.8 km || 
|-id=406 bgcolor=#d6d6d6
| 130406 ||  || — || July 23, 2000 || Socorro || LINEAR || — || align=right | 10 km || 
|-id=407 bgcolor=#fefefe
| 130407 ||  || — || July 30, 2000 || Socorro || LINEAR || — || align=right | 3.2 km || 
|-id=408 bgcolor=#fefefe
| 130408 ||  || — || July 30, 2000 || Socorro || LINEAR || — || align=right | 1.4 km || 
|-id=409 bgcolor=#fefefe
| 130409 ||  || — || July 30, 2000 || Socorro || LINEAR || FLO || align=right | 3.6 km || 
|-id=410 bgcolor=#fefefe
| 130410 ||  || — || July 30, 2000 || Socorro || LINEAR || — || align=right | 3.0 km || 
|-id=411 bgcolor=#fefefe
| 130411 ||  || — || July 30, 2000 || Socorro || LINEAR || — || align=right | 2.1 km || 
|-id=412 bgcolor=#fefefe
| 130412 ||  || — || July 30, 2000 || Socorro || LINEAR || — || align=right | 1.5 km || 
|-id=413 bgcolor=#fefefe
| 130413 ||  || — || July 31, 2000 || Socorro || LINEAR || — || align=right | 2.0 km || 
|-id=414 bgcolor=#fefefe
| 130414 ||  || — || July 30, 2000 || Socorro || LINEAR || V || align=right | 1.7 km || 
|-id=415 bgcolor=#FA8072
| 130415 ||  || — || July 29, 2000 || Anderson Mesa || LONEOS || — || align=right | 2.8 km || 
|-id=416 bgcolor=#fefefe
| 130416 ||  || — || July 29, 2000 || Anderson Mesa || LONEOS || — || align=right | 1.5 km || 
|-id=417 bgcolor=#fefefe
| 130417 ||  || — || July 29, 2000 || Anderson Mesa || LONEOS || — || align=right | 2.5 km || 
|-id=418 bgcolor=#d6d6d6
| 130418 ||  || — || July 29, 2000 || Anderson Mesa || LONEOS || 7:4 || align=right | 6.8 km || 
|-id=419 bgcolor=#fefefe
| 130419 || 2000 PP || — || August 1, 2000 || Kitt Peak || Spacewatch || V || align=right | 1.0 km || 
|-id=420 bgcolor=#fefefe
| 130420 ||  || — || August 1, 2000 || Socorro || LINEAR || FLO || align=right | 1.4 km || 
|-id=421 bgcolor=#fefefe
| 130421 ||  || — || August 1, 2000 || Socorro || LINEAR || — || align=right | 2.1 km || 
|-id=422 bgcolor=#fefefe
| 130422 ||  || — || August 1, 2000 || Socorro || LINEAR || — || align=right | 1.6 km || 
|-id=423 bgcolor=#fefefe
| 130423 ||  || — || August 1, 2000 || Socorro || LINEAR || — || align=right | 1.8 km || 
|-id=424 bgcolor=#fefefe
| 130424 ||  || — || August 1, 2000 || Socorro || LINEAR || — || align=right | 1.7 km || 
|-id=425 bgcolor=#fefefe
| 130425 ||  || — || August 1, 2000 || Socorro || LINEAR || V || align=right | 1.5 km || 
|-id=426 bgcolor=#fefefe
| 130426 ||  || — || August 1, 2000 || Socorro || LINEAR || FLO || align=right | 1.5 km || 
|-id=427 bgcolor=#fefefe
| 130427 ||  || — || August 1, 2000 || Socorro || LINEAR || — || align=right | 1.6 km || 
|-id=428 bgcolor=#fefefe
| 130428 ||  || — || August 1, 2000 || Socorro || LINEAR || — || align=right | 1.4 km || 
|-id=429 bgcolor=#fefefe
| 130429 ||  || — || August 2, 2000 || Socorro || LINEAR || FLO || align=right | 1.5 km || 
|-id=430 bgcolor=#fefefe
| 130430 ||  || — || August 2, 2000 || Socorro || LINEAR || — || align=right | 1.5 km || 
|-id=431 bgcolor=#fefefe
| 130431 ||  || — || August 2, 2000 || Kitt Peak || Spacewatch || — || align=right | 1.6 km || 
|-id=432 bgcolor=#fefefe
| 130432 ||  || — || August 24, 2000 || Socorro || LINEAR || — || align=right | 2.0 km || 
|-id=433 bgcolor=#fefefe
| 130433 ||  || — || August 26, 2000 || Ondřejov || P. Pravec, P. Kušnirák || — || align=right | 1.8 km || 
|-id=434 bgcolor=#fefefe
| 130434 ||  || — || August 24, 2000 || Socorro || LINEAR || — || align=right | 1.3 km || 
|-id=435 bgcolor=#fefefe
| 130435 ||  || — || August 24, 2000 || Socorro || LINEAR || — || align=right | 2.3 km || 
|-id=436 bgcolor=#fefefe
| 130436 ||  || — || August 24, 2000 || Socorro || LINEAR || NYS || align=right | 1.7 km || 
|-id=437 bgcolor=#fefefe
| 130437 ||  || — || August 24, 2000 || Socorro || LINEAR || NYS || align=right | 1.2 km || 
|-id=438 bgcolor=#fefefe
| 130438 ||  || — || August 24, 2000 || Socorro || LINEAR || V || align=right | 1.4 km || 
|-id=439 bgcolor=#fefefe
| 130439 ||  || — || August 24, 2000 || Socorro || LINEAR || NYS || align=right | 1.3 km || 
|-id=440 bgcolor=#fefefe
| 130440 ||  || — || August 24, 2000 || Socorro || LINEAR || — || align=right | 1.7 km || 
|-id=441 bgcolor=#fefefe
| 130441 ||  || — || August 24, 2000 || Socorro || LINEAR || — || align=right | 2.1 km || 
|-id=442 bgcolor=#fefefe
| 130442 ||  || — || August 25, 2000 || Socorro || LINEAR || V || align=right | 1.9 km || 
|-id=443 bgcolor=#fefefe
| 130443 ||  || — || August 26, 2000 || Reedy Creek || J. Broughton || — || align=right | 2.4 km || 
|-id=444 bgcolor=#fefefe
| 130444 ||  || — || August 24, 2000 || Socorro || LINEAR || FLO || align=right | 1.7 km || 
|-id=445 bgcolor=#fefefe
| 130445 ||  || — || August 26, 2000 || Socorro || LINEAR || — || align=right | 1.5 km || 
|-id=446 bgcolor=#fefefe
| 130446 ||  || — || August 24, 2000 || Socorro || LINEAR || FLO || align=right | 1.1 km || 
|-id=447 bgcolor=#E9E9E9
| 130447 ||  || — || August 24, 2000 || Socorro || LINEAR || — || align=right | 1.5 km || 
|-id=448 bgcolor=#fefefe
| 130448 ||  || — || August 24, 2000 || Socorro || LINEAR || — || align=right | 1.4 km || 
|-id=449 bgcolor=#fefefe
| 130449 ||  || — || August 24, 2000 || Socorro || LINEAR || — || align=right | 1.4 km || 
|-id=450 bgcolor=#fefefe
| 130450 ||  || — || August 24, 2000 || Socorro || LINEAR || — || align=right | 1.6 km || 
|-id=451 bgcolor=#fefefe
| 130451 ||  || — || August 26, 2000 || Socorro || LINEAR || — || align=right | 1.1 km || 
|-id=452 bgcolor=#fefefe
| 130452 ||  || — || August 26, 2000 || Socorro || LINEAR || — || align=right | 2.3 km || 
|-id=453 bgcolor=#d6d6d6
| 130453 ||  || — || August 26, 2000 || Socorro || LINEAR || 3:2 || align=right | 6.9 km || 
|-id=454 bgcolor=#fefefe
| 130454 ||  || — || August 28, 2000 || Socorro || LINEAR || — || align=right | 1.8 km || 
|-id=455 bgcolor=#fefefe
| 130455 ||  || — || August 28, 2000 || Socorro || LINEAR || — || align=right | 3.8 km || 
|-id=456 bgcolor=#fefefe
| 130456 ||  || — || August 28, 2000 || Socorro || LINEAR || V || align=right | 1.5 km || 
|-id=457 bgcolor=#fefefe
| 130457 ||  || — || August 28, 2000 || Socorro || LINEAR || V || align=right | 1.5 km || 
|-id=458 bgcolor=#fefefe
| 130458 ||  || — || August 28, 2000 || Socorro || LINEAR || — || align=right | 2.6 km || 
|-id=459 bgcolor=#fefefe
| 130459 ||  || — || August 28, 2000 || Socorro || LINEAR || V || align=right | 1.4 km || 
|-id=460 bgcolor=#fefefe
| 130460 ||  || — || August 28, 2000 || Socorro || LINEAR || — || align=right | 2.3 km || 
|-id=461 bgcolor=#fefefe
| 130461 ||  || — || August 24, 2000 || Socorro || LINEAR || — || align=right | 2.0 km || 
|-id=462 bgcolor=#fefefe
| 130462 ||  || — || August 24, 2000 || Socorro || LINEAR || — || align=right | 2.3 km || 
|-id=463 bgcolor=#fefefe
| 130463 ||  || — || August 24, 2000 || Socorro || LINEAR || NYS || align=right | 4.3 km || 
|-id=464 bgcolor=#fefefe
| 130464 ||  || — || August 24, 2000 || Socorro || LINEAR || NYS || align=right | 1.2 km || 
|-id=465 bgcolor=#fefefe
| 130465 ||  || — || August 24, 2000 || Socorro || LINEAR || — || align=right | 2.9 km || 
|-id=466 bgcolor=#fefefe
| 130466 ||  || — || August 24, 2000 || Socorro || LINEAR || — || align=right | 2.4 km || 
|-id=467 bgcolor=#fefefe
| 130467 ||  || — || August 24, 2000 || Socorro || LINEAR || — || align=right | 2.0 km || 
|-id=468 bgcolor=#fefefe
| 130468 ||  || — || August 24, 2000 || Socorro || LINEAR || NYS || align=right | 1.6 km || 
|-id=469 bgcolor=#E9E9E9
| 130469 ||  || — || August 24, 2000 || Socorro || LINEAR || — || align=right | 3.6 km || 
|-id=470 bgcolor=#fefefe
| 130470 ||  || — || August 24, 2000 || Socorro || LINEAR || NYS || align=right | 1.2 km || 
|-id=471 bgcolor=#fefefe
| 130471 ||  || — || August 25, 2000 || Socorro || LINEAR || FLO || align=right | 1.4 km || 
|-id=472 bgcolor=#fefefe
| 130472 ||  || — || August 25, 2000 || Socorro || LINEAR || — || align=right | 1.8 km || 
|-id=473 bgcolor=#fefefe
| 130473 ||  || — || August 25, 2000 || Socorro || LINEAR || V || align=right | 1.6 km || 
|-id=474 bgcolor=#fefefe
| 130474 ||  || — || August 25, 2000 || Socorro || LINEAR || — || align=right | 1.3 km || 
|-id=475 bgcolor=#fefefe
| 130475 ||  || — || August 25, 2000 || Socorro || LINEAR || V || align=right | 1.8 km || 
|-id=476 bgcolor=#fefefe
| 130476 ||  || — || August 26, 2000 || Socorro || LINEAR || NYS || align=right | 1.2 km || 
|-id=477 bgcolor=#fefefe
| 130477 ||  || — || August 26, 2000 || Socorro || LINEAR || — || align=right | 1.1 km || 
|-id=478 bgcolor=#fefefe
| 130478 ||  || — || August 28, 2000 || Socorro || LINEAR || NYS || align=right | 1.4 km || 
|-id=479 bgcolor=#fefefe
| 130479 ||  || — || August 28, 2000 || Socorro || LINEAR || FLO || align=right | 1.5 km || 
|-id=480 bgcolor=#FA8072
| 130480 ||  || — || August 28, 2000 || Socorro || LINEAR || — || align=right | 1.5 km || 
|-id=481 bgcolor=#fefefe
| 130481 ||  || — || August 28, 2000 || Socorro || LINEAR || FLO || align=right | 1.5 km || 
|-id=482 bgcolor=#fefefe
| 130482 ||  || — || August 28, 2000 || Socorro || LINEAR || NYS || align=right | 1.3 km || 
|-id=483 bgcolor=#fefefe
| 130483 ||  || — || August 28, 2000 || Socorro || LINEAR || V || align=right | 1.3 km || 
|-id=484 bgcolor=#fefefe
| 130484 ||  || — || August 28, 2000 || Socorro || LINEAR || V || align=right | 1.3 km || 
|-id=485 bgcolor=#fefefe
| 130485 ||  || — || August 28, 2000 || Socorro || LINEAR || MAS || align=right | 1.7 km || 
|-id=486 bgcolor=#fefefe
| 130486 ||  || — || August 28, 2000 || Socorro || LINEAR || — || align=right | 2.2 km || 
|-id=487 bgcolor=#fefefe
| 130487 ||  || — || August 24, 2000 || Socorro || LINEAR || — || align=right | 1.3 km || 
|-id=488 bgcolor=#fefefe
| 130488 ||  || — || August 24, 2000 || Socorro || LINEAR || NYS || align=right | 1.3 km || 
|-id=489 bgcolor=#fefefe
| 130489 ||  || — || August 24, 2000 || Socorro || LINEAR || V || align=right | 1.3 km || 
|-id=490 bgcolor=#fefefe
| 130490 ||  || — || August 28, 2000 || Socorro || LINEAR || — || align=right | 1.6 km || 
|-id=491 bgcolor=#E9E9E9
| 130491 ||  || — || August 29, 2000 || Črni Vrh || Črni Vrh || — || align=right | 1.4 km || 
|-id=492 bgcolor=#fefefe
| 130492 ||  || — || August 25, 2000 || Socorro || LINEAR || — || align=right | 1.7 km || 
|-id=493 bgcolor=#fefefe
| 130493 ||  || — || August 25, 2000 || Socorro || LINEAR || — || align=right | 2.0 km || 
|-id=494 bgcolor=#fefefe
| 130494 ||  || — || August 25, 2000 || Socorro || LINEAR || FLO || align=right | 1.4 km || 
|-id=495 bgcolor=#fefefe
| 130495 ||  || — || August 31, 2000 || Socorro || LINEAR || — || align=right | 1.9 km || 
|-id=496 bgcolor=#fefefe
| 130496 ||  || — || August 24, 2000 || Socorro || LINEAR || FLO || align=right | 1.9 km || 
|-id=497 bgcolor=#E9E9E9
| 130497 ||  || — || August 24, 2000 || Socorro || LINEAR || — || align=right | 1.8 km || 
|-id=498 bgcolor=#fefefe
| 130498 ||  || — || August 25, 2000 || Socorro || LINEAR || V || align=right | 1.3 km || 
|-id=499 bgcolor=#fefefe
| 130499 ||  || — || August 26, 2000 || Socorro || LINEAR || ERI || align=right | 4.4 km || 
|-id=500 bgcolor=#fefefe
| 130500 ||  || — || August 26, 2000 || Socorro || LINEAR || NYS || align=right | 1.7 km || 
|}

130501–130600 

|-bgcolor=#fefefe
| 130501 ||  || — || August 29, 2000 || Socorro || LINEAR || — || align=right | 1.1 km || 
|-id=502 bgcolor=#fefefe
| 130502 ||  || — || August 31, 2000 || Socorro || LINEAR || — || align=right | 1.8 km || 
|-id=503 bgcolor=#fefefe
| 130503 ||  || — || August 31, 2000 || Socorro || LINEAR || V || align=right | 1.5 km || 
|-id=504 bgcolor=#fefefe
| 130504 ||  || — || August 31, 2000 || Socorro || LINEAR || — || align=right | 2.3 km || 
|-id=505 bgcolor=#fefefe
| 130505 ||  || — || August 31, 2000 || Socorro || LINEAR || NYS || align=right | 1.8 km || 
|-id=506 bgcolor=#fefefe
| 130506 ||  || — || August 31, 2000 || Socorro || LINEAR || — || align=right | 1.4 km || 
|-id=507 bgcolor=#fefefe
| 130507 ||  || — || August 31, 2000 || Socorro || LINEAR || — || align=right | 2.0 km || 
|-id=508 bgcolor=#fefefe
| 130508 ||  || — || August 31, 2000 || Socorro || LINEAR || V || align=right | 1.6 km || 
|-id=509 bgcolor=#fefefe
| 130509 ||  || — || August 31, 2000 || Socorro || LINEAR || — || align=right | 1.6 km || 
|-id=510 bgcolor=#fefefe
| 130510 ||  || — || August 26, 2000 || Socorro || LINEAR || FLO || align=right | 2.4 km || 
|-id=511 bgcolor=#fefefe
| 130511 ||  || — || August 28, 2000 || Socorro || LINEAR || — || align=right | 1.9 km || 
|-id=512 bgcolor=#fefefe
| 130512 ||  || — || August 31, 2000 || Socorro || LINEAR || — || align=right | 2.2 km || 
|-id=513 bgcolor=#fefefe
| 130513 ||  || — || August 31, 2000 || Socorro || LINEAR || — || align=right | 1.6 km || 
|-id=514 bgcolor=#fefefe
| 130514 ||  || — || August 31, 2000 || Socorro || LINEAR || — || align=right | 1.6 km || 
|-id=515 bgcolor=#fefefe
| 130515 ||  || — || August 31, 2000 || Socorro || LINEAR || V || align=right | 1.5 km || 
|-id=516 bgcolor=#fefefe
| 130516 ||  || — || August 31, 2000 || Socorro || LINEAR || — || align=right | 2.1 km || 
|-id=517 bgcolor=#fefefe
| 130517 ||  || — || August 31, 2000 || Socorro || LINEAR || — || align=right | 3.6 km || 
|-id=518 bgcolor=#fefefe
| 130518 ||  || — || August 31, 2000 || Socorro || LINEAR || — || align=right | 1.4 km || 
|-id=519 bgcolor=#fefefe
| 130519 ||  || — || August 31, 2000 || Socorro || LINEAR || — || align=right | 2.0 km || 
|-id=520 bgcolor=#fefefe
| 130520 ||  || — || August 31, 2000 || Socorro || LINEAR || — || align=right | 1.5 km || 
|-id=521 bgcolor=#fefefe
| 130521 ||  || — || August 31, 2000 || Socorro || LINEAR || — || align=right | 2.3 km || 
|-id=522 bgcolor=#fefefe
| 130522 ||  || — || August 26, 2000 || Socorro || LINEAR || NYS || align=right | 1.6 km || 
|-id=523 bgcolor=#fefefe
| 130523 ||  || — || August 26, 2000 || Socorro || LINEAR || EUT || align=right data-sort-value="0.97" | 970 m || 
|-id=524 bgcolor=#fefefe
| 130524 ||  || — || August 26, 2000 || Socorro || LINEAR || — || align=right | 1.7 km || 
|-id=525 bgcolor=#fefefe
| 130525 ||  || — || August 26, 2000 || Socorro || LINEAR || — || align=right | 1.8 km || 
|-id=526 bgcolor=#fefefe
| 130526 ||  || — || August 31, 2000 || Socorro || LINEAR || — || align=right | 1.5 km || 
|-id=527 bgcolor=#fefefe
| 130527 ||  || — || August 29, 2000 || Socorro || LINEAR || — || align=right | 1.9 km || 
|-id=528 bgcolor=#fefefe
| 130528 ||  || — || August 29, 2000 || Socorro || LINEAR || — || align=right | 3.8 km || 
|-id=529 bgcolor=#fefefe
| 130529 ||  || — || August 29, 2000 || Socorro || LINEAR || — || align=right | 1.6 km || 
|-id=530 bgcolor=#fefefe
| 130530 ||  || — || August 29, 2000 || Socorro || LINEAR || FLO || align=right | 1.6 km || 
|-id=531 bgcolor=#fefefe
| 130531 ||  || — || August 29, 2000 || Socorro || LINEAR || ERI || align=right | 5.0 km || 
|-id=532 bgcolor=#fefefe
| 130532 ||  || — || August 29, 2000 || Socorro || LINEAR || — || align=right | 2.6 km || 
|-id=533 bgcolor=#fefefe
| 130533 ||  || — || August 29, 2000 || Socorro || LINEAR || — || align=right | 1.5 km || 
|-id=534 bgcolor=#fefefe
| 130534 ||  || — || August 31, 2000 || Socorro || LINEAR || — || align=right | 1.2 km || 
|-id=535 bgcolor=#fefefe
| 130535 ||  || — || August 31, 2000 || Socorro || LINEAR || — || align=right | 1.7 km || 
|-id=536 bgcolor=#fefefe
| 130536 ||  || — || August 31, 2000 || Socorro || LINEAR || NYS || align=right | 4.0 km || 
|-id=537 bgcolor=#fefefe
| 130537 ||  || — || August 31, 2000 || Socorro || LINEAR || — || align=right | 1.3 km || 
|-id=538 bgcolor=#fefefe
| 130538 ||  || — || August 31, 2000 || Socorro || LINEAR || — || align=right | 1.6 km || 
|-id=539 bgcolor=#fefefe
| 130539 ||  || — || August 31, 2000 || Socorro || LINEAR || — || align=right | 1.5 km || 
|-id=540 bgcolor=#fefefe
| 130540 ||  || — || August 31, 2000 || Socorro || LINEAR || — || align=right | 1.3 km || 
|-id=541 bgcolor=#fefefe
| 130541 ||  || — || August 31, 2000 || Socorro || LINEAR || V || align=right | 1.4 km || 
|-id=542 bgcolor=#fefefe
| 130542 ||  || — || August 31, 2000 || Socorro || LINEAR || — || align=right | 1.3 km || 
|-id=543 bgcolor=#fefefe
| 130543 ||  || — || August 31, 2000 || Socorro || LINEAR || NYS || align=right | 1.1 km || 
|-id=544 bgcolor=#fefefe
| 130544 ||  || — || August 21, 2000 || Anderson Mesa || LONEOS || — || align=right | 2.1 km || 
|-id=545 bgcolor=#fefefe
| 130545 ||  || — || August 21, 2000 || Anderson Mesa || LONEOS || FLO || align=right | 1.3 km || 
|-id=546 bgcolor=#fefefe
| 130546 ||  || — || August 31, 2000 || Socorro || LINEAR || — || align=right | 2.1 km || 
|-id=547 bgcolor=#fefefe
| 130547 ||  || — || August 31, 2000 || Socorro || LINEAR || — || align=right | 1.6 km || 
|-id=548 bgcolor=#fefefe
| 130548 ||  || — || August 31, 2000 || Socorro || LINEAR || — || align=right | 2.1 km || 
|-id=549 bgcolor=#fefefe
| 130549 || 2000 RT || — || September 1, 2000 || Socorro || LINEAR || — || align=right | 1.4 km || 
|-id=550 bgcolor=#fefefe
| 130550 ||  || — || September 1, 2000 || Socorro || LINEAR || — || align=right | 1.6 km || 
|-id=551 bgcolor=#fefefe
| 130551 ||  || — || September 1, 2000 || Socorro || LINEAR || — || align=right | 1.8 km || 
|-id=552 bgcolor=#fefefe
| 130552 ||  || — || September 1, 2000 || Socorro || LINEAR || — || align=right | 2.5 km || 
|-id=553 bgcolor=#fefefe
| 130553 ||  || — || September 1, 2000 || Socorro || LINEAR || V || align=right | 2.8 km || 
|-id=554 bgcolor=#fefefe
| 130554 ||  || — || September 1, 2000 || Socorro || LINEAR || — || align=right | 2.1 km || 
|-id=555 bgcolor=#fefefe
| 130555 ||  || — || September 1, 2000 || Socorro || LINEAR || FLO || align=right | 1.5 km || 
|-id=556 bgcolor=#fefefe
| 130556 ||  || — || September 1, 2000 || Socorro || LINEAR || V || align=right | 1.6 km || 
|-id=557 bgcolor=#fefefe
| 130557 ||  || — || September 1, 2000 || Socorro || LINEAR || V || align=right | 2.0 km || 
|-id=558 bgcolor=#fefefe
| 130558 ||  || — || September 1, 2000 || Socorro || LINEAR || FLO || align=right | 1.8 km || 
|-id=559 bgcolor=#fefefe
| 130559 ||  || — || September 1, 2000 || Socorro || LINEAR || V || align=right | 1.6 km || 
|-id=560 bgcolor=#fefefe
| 130560 ||  || — || September 1, 2000 || Socorro || LINEAR || — || align=right | 1.9 km || 
|-id=561 bgcolor=#fefefe
| 130561 ||  || — || September 1, 2000 || Socorro || LINEAR || FLO || align=right | 1.4 km || 
|-id=562 bgcolor=#fefefe
| 130562 ||  || — || September 1, 2000 || Socorro || LINEAR || — || align=right | 1.9 km || 
|-id=563 bgcolor=#E9E9E9
| 130563 ||  || — || September 1, 2000 || Socorro || LINEAR || — || align=right | 3.8 km || 
|-id=564 bgcolor=#fefefe
| 130564 ||  || — || September 5, 2000 || Kvistaberg || UDAS || — || align=right | 1.9 km || 
|-id=565 bgcolor=#fefefe
| 130565 ||  || — || September 5, 2000 || Kvistaberg || UDAS || FLO || align=right | 1.3 km || 
|-id=566 bgcolor=#E9E9E9
| 130566 ||  || — || September 5, 2000 || Socorro || LINEAR || — || align=right | 3.5 km || 
|-id=567 bgcolor=#fefefe
| 130567 ||  || — || September 2, 2000 || Socorro || LINEAR || — || align=right | 1.5 km || 
|-id=568 bgcolor=#fefefe
| 130568 ||  || — || September 3, 2000 || Socorro || LINEAR || — || align=right | 4.7 km || 
|-id=569 bgcolor=#fefefe
| 130569 ||  || — || September 3, 2000 || Socorro || LINEAR || V || align=right | 1.9 km || 
|-id=570 bgcolor=#E9E9E9
| 130570 ||  || — || September 3, 2000 || Socorro || LINEAR || — || align=right | 2.4 km || 
|-id=571 bgcolor=#fefefe
| 130571 ||  || — || September 3, 2000 || Socorro || LINEAR || — || align=right | 1.8 km || 
|-id=572 bgcolor=#fefefe
| 130572 ||  || — || September 3, 2000 || Socorro || LINEAR || V || align=right | 1.6 km || 
|-id=573 bgcolor=#fefefe
| 130573 ||  || — || September 5, 2000 || Socorro || LINEAR || MAS || align=right | 1.1 km || 
|-id=574 bgcolor=#fefefe
| 130574 ||  || — || September 8, 2000 || Desert Beaver || W. K. Y. Yeung || FLO || align=right | 1.3 km || 
|-id=575 bgcolor=#fefefe
| 130575 ||  || — || September 1, 2000 || Socorro || LINEAR || — || align=right | 1.9 km || 
|-id=576 bgcolor=#fefefe
| 130576 ||  || — || September 2, 2000 || Socorro || LINEAR || — || align=right | 2.3 km || 
|-id=577 bgcolor=#fefefe
| 130577 ||  || — || September 2, 2000 || Socorro || LINEAR || — || align=right | 2.1 km || 
|-id=578 bgcolor=#fefefe
| 130578 ||  || — || September 2, 2000 || Socorro || LINEAR || FLO || align=right | 1.3 km || 
|-id=579 bgcolor=#fefefe
| 130579 ||  || — || September 2, 2000 || Socorro || LINEAR || V || align=right | 1.3 km || 
|-id=580 bgcolor=#E9E9E9
| 130580 ||  || — || September 2, 2000 || Socorro || LINEAR || — || align=right | 1.3 km || 
|-id=581 bgcolor=#fefefe
| 130581 ||  || — || September 2, 2000 || Socorro || LINEAR || NYS || align=right | 2.1 km || 
|-id=582 bgcolor=#fefefe
| 130582 ||  || — || September 3, 2000 || Socorro || LINEAR || — || align=right | 2.2 km || 
|-id=583 bgcolor=#E9E9E9
| 130583 ||  || — || September 3, 2000 || Socorro || LINEAR || MIT || align=right | 6.3 km || 
|-id=584 bgcolor=#fefefe
| 130584 ||  || — || September 5, 2000 || Socorro || LINEAR || — || align=right | 1.9 km || 
|-id=585 bgcolor=#fefefe
| 130585 ||  || — || September 9, 2000 || Višnjan Observatory || K. Korlević || NYS || align=right | 1.6 km || 
|-id=586 bgcolor=#fefefe
| 130586 ||  || — || September 9, 2000 || Farpoint || G. Hug || V || align=right data-sort-value="0.97" | 970 m || 
|-id=587 bgcolor=#fefefe
| 130587 ||  || — || September 1, 2000 || Socorro || LINEAR || FLO || align=right | 1.7 km || 
|-id=588 bgcolor=#C2FFFF
| 130588 ||  || — || September 1, 2000 || Socorro || LINEAR || L5 || align=right | 19 km || 
|-id=589 bgcolor=#fefefe
| 130589 ||  || — || September 2, 2000 || Anderson Mesa || LONEOS || — || align=right | 1.5 km || 
|-id=590 bgcolor=#fefefe
| 130590 ||  || — || September 2, 2000 || Anderson Mesa || LONEOS || NYS || align=right data-sort-value="0.92" | 920 m || 
|-id=591 bgcolor=#fefefe
| 130591 ||  || — || September 2, 2000 || Anderson Mesa || LONEOS || — || align=right | 1.1 km || 
|-id=592 bgcolor=#C2FFFF
| 130592 ||  || — || September 2, 2000 || Anderson Mesa || LONEOS || L5 || align=right | 19 km || 
|-id=593 bgcolor=#fefefe
| 130593 ||  || — || September 3, 2000 || Socorro || LINEAR || FLO || align=right | 1.2 km || 
|-id=594 bgcolor=#fefefe
| 130594 ||  || — || September 3, 2000 || Socorro || LINEAR || — || align=right | 1.6 km || 
|-id=595 bgcolor=#fefefe
| 130595 ||  || — || September 3, 2000 || Socorro || LINEAR || — || align=right | 2.4 km || 
|-id=596 bgcolor=#fefefe
| 130596 ||  || — || September 3, 2000 || Socorro || LINEAR || — || align=right | 1.8 km || 
|-id=597 bgcolor=#fefefe
| 130597 ||  || — || September 4, 2000 || Anderson Mesa || LONEOS || FLO || align=right | 1.4 km || 
|-id=598 bgcolor=#fefefe
| 130598 ||  || — || September 4, 2000 || Anderson Mesa || LONEOS || — || align=right | 1.8 km || 
|-id=599 bgcolor=#E9E9E9
| 130599 ||  || — || September 4, 2000 || Anderson Mesa || LONEOS || — || align=right | 1.5 km || 
|-id=600 bgcolor=#fefefe
| 130600 ||  || — || September 5, 2000 || Anderson Mesa || LONEOS || — || align=right | 3.6 km || 
|}

130601–130700 

|-bgcolor=#E9E9E9
| 130601 || 2000 SD || — || September 17, 2000 || Socorro || LINEAR || — || align=right | 4.1 km || 
|-id=602 bgcolor=#fefefe
| 130602 ||  || — || September 21, 2000 || Haleakala || NEAT || NYS || align=right | 2.9 km || 
|-id=603 bgcolor=#E9E9E9
| 130603 ||  || — || September 24, 2000 || Bisei SG Center || BATTeRS || — || align=right | 3.4 km || 
|-id=604 bgcolor=#fefefe
| 130604 ||  || — || September 23, 2000 || Desert Beaver || W. K. Y. Yeung || — || align=right | 2.9 km || 
|-id=605 bgcolor=#fefefe
| 130605 ||  || — || September 23, 2000 || Socorro || LINEAR || — || align=right | 4.3 km || 
|-id=606 bgcolor=#fefefe
| 130606 ||  || — || September 23, 2000 || Socorro || LINEAR || — || align=right | 2.4 km || 
|-id=607 bgcolor=#fefefe
| 130607 ||  || — || September 23, 2000 || Socorro || LINEAR || FLO || align=right | 1.4 km || 
|-id=608 bgcolor=#fefefe
| 130608 ||  || — || September 23, 2000 || Socorro || LINEAR || V || align=right | 1.2 km || 
|-id=609 bgcolor=#d6d6d6
| 130609 ||  || — || September 23, 2000 || Socorro || LINEAR || 3:2 || align=right | 10 km || 
|-id=610 bgcolor=#fefefe
| 130610 ||  || — || September 20, 2000 || Haleakala || NEAT || MAS || align=right | 1.3 km || 
|-id=611 bgcolor=#fefefe
| 130611 ||  || — || September 26, 2000 || Tebbutt || F. B. Zoltowski || NYS || align=right | 1.2 km || 
|-id=612 bgcolor=#fefefe
| 130612 ||  || — || September 26, 2000 || Bisei SG Center || BATTeRS || — || align=right | 1.5 km || 
|-id=613 bgcolor=#fefefe
| 130613 ||  || — || September 24, 2000 || Socorro || LINEAR || FLO || align=right | 1.3 km || 
|-id=614 bgcolor=#fefefe
| 130614 ||  || — || September 24, 2000 || Socorro || LINEAR || MAS || align=right | 1.7 km || 
|-id=615 bgcolor=#fefefe
| 130615 ||  || — || September 24, 2000 || Socorro || LINEAR || SUL || align=right | 4.1 km || 
|-id=616 bgcolor=#fefefe
| 130616 ||  || — || September 24, 2000 || Socorro || LINEAR || — || align=right | 1.4 km || 
|-id=617 bgcolor=#fefefe
| 130617 ||  || — || September 24, 2000 || Socorro || LINEAR || — || align=right | 1.5 km || 
|-id=618 bgcolor=#fefefe
| 130618 ||  || — || September 24, 2000 || Socorro || LINEAR || — || align=right | 1.5 km || 
|-id=619 bgcolor=#E9E9E9
| 130619 ||  || — || September 24, 2000 || Socorro || LINEAR || — || align=right | 1.8 km || 
|-id=620 bgcolor=#fefefe
| 130620 ||  || — || September 24, 2000 || Socorro || LINEAR || — || align=right | 1.2 km || 
|-id=621 bgcolor=#fefefe
| 130621 ||  || — || September 24, 2000 || Socorro || LINEAR || NYS || align=right | 1.1 km || 
|-id=622 bgcolor=#fefefe
| 130622 ||  || — || September 24, 2000 || Socorro || LINEAR || V || align=right | 1.5 km || 
|-id=623 bgcolor=#fefefe
| 130623 ||  || — || September 24, 2000 || Socorro || LINEAR || — || align=right | 1.7 km || 
|-id=624 bgcolor=#fefefe
| 130624 ||  || — || September 26, 2000 || Črni Vrh || Črni Vrh || V || align=right | 1.3 km || 
|-id=625 bgcolor=#fefefe
| 130625 ||  || — || September 24, 2000 || Socorro || LINEAR || PHO || align=right | 2.1 km || 
|-id=626 bgcolor=#fefefe
| 130626 ||  || — || September 23, 2000 || Socorro || LINEAR || — || align=right | 1.4 km || 
|-id=627 bgcolor=#fefefe
| 130627 ||  || — || September 24, 2000 || Socorro || LINEAR || V || align=right | 1.6 km || 
|-id=628 bgcolor=#fefefe
| 130628 ||  || — || September 24, 2000 || Socorro || LINEAR || — || align=right | 1.4 km || 
|-id=629 bgcolor=#fefefe
| 130629 ||  || — || September 24, 2000 || Socorro || LINEAR || NYS || align=right | 1.1 km || 
|-id=630 bgcolor=#fefefe
| 130630 ||  || — || September 24, 2000 || Socorro || LINEAR || FLO || align=right | 1.1 km || 
|-id=631 bgcolor=#fefefe
| 130631 ||  || — || September 24, 2000 || Socorro || LINEAR || V || align=right | 1.2 km || 
|-id=632 bgcolor=#fefefe
| 130632 ||  || — || September 24, 2000 || Socorro || LINEAR || — || align=right | 1.6 km || 
|-id=633 bgcolor=#fefefe
| 130633 ||  || — || September 24, 2000 || Socorro || LINEAR || — || align=right | 1.9 km || 
|-id=634 bgcolor=#fefefe
| 130634 ||  || — || September 24, 2000 || Socorro || LINEAR || NYS || align=right | 1.6 km || 
|-id=635 bgcolor=#fefefe
| 130635 ||  || — || September 24, 2000 || Socorro || LINEAR || — || align=right | 1.6 km || 
|-id=636 bgcolor=#fefefe
| 130636 ||  || — || September 24, 2000 || Socorro || LINEAR || V || align=right | 1.3 km || 
|-id=637 bgcolor=#fefefe
| 130637 ||  || — || September 24, 2000 || Socorro || LINEAR || — || align=right | 3.3 km || 
|-id=638 bgcolor=#fefefe
| 130638 ||  || — || September 24, 2000 || Socorro || LINEAR || — || align=right | 2.4 km || 
|-id=639 bgcolor=#fefefe
| 130639 ||  || — || September 24, 2000 || Socorro || LINEAR || — || align=right | 1.7 km || 
|-id=640 bgcolor=#fefefe
| 130640 ||  || — || September 24, 2000 || Socorro || LINEAR || — || align=right | 2.1 km || 
|-id=641 bgcolor=#fefefe
| 130641 ||  || — || September 24, 2000 || Socorro || LINEAR || — || align=right | 1.6 km || 
|-id=642 bgcolor=#fefefe
| 130642 ||  || — || September 24, 2000 || Socorro || LINEAR || — || align=right | 1.3 km || 
|-id=643 bgcolor=#fefefe
| 130643 ||  || — || September 24, 2000 || Socorro || LINEAR || NYS || align=right | 1.4 km || 
|-id=644 bgcolor=#E9E9E9
| 130644 ||  || — || September 24, 2000 || Socorro || LINEAR || — || align=right | 2.1 km || 
|-id=645 bgcolor=#fefefe
| 130645 ||  || — || September 24, 2000 || Socorro || LINEAR || MAS || align=right | 1.4 km || 
|-id=646 bgcolor=#fefefe
| 130646 ||  || — || September 24, 2000 || Socorro || LINEAR || — || align=right | 1.4 km || 
|-id=647 bgcolor=#fefefe
| 130647 ||  || — || September 24, 2000 || Socorro || LINEAR || NYS || align=right | 1.6 km || 
|-id=648 bgcolor=#C2FFFF
| 130648 ||  || — || September 24, 2000 || Socorro || LINEAR || L5 || align=right | 14 km || 
|-id=649 bgcolor=#fefefe
| 130649 ||  || — || September 24, 2000 || Socorro || LINEAR || NYS || align=right | 4.8 km || 
|-id=650 bgcolor=#fefefe
| 130650 ||  || — || September 24, 2000 || Socorro || LINEAR || — || align=right | 1.5 km || 
|-id=651 bgcolor=#E9E9E9
| 130651 ||  || — || September 24, 2000 || Socorro || LINEAR || — || align=right | 4.1 km || 
|-id=652 bgcolor=#E9E9E9
| 130652 ||  || — || September 24, 2000 || Socorro || LINEAR || JUN || align=right | 1.8 km || 
|-id=653 bgcolor=#fefefe
| 130653 ||  || — || September 24, 2000 || Socorro || LINEAR || V || align=right | 1.3 km || 
|-id=654 bgcolor=#fefefe
| 130654 ||  || — || September 23, 2000 || Socorro || LINEAR || — || align=right | 1.8 km || 
|-id=655 bgcolor=#fefefe
| 130655 ||  || — || September 23, 2000 || Socorro || LINEAR || — || align=right | 1.5 km || 
|-id=656 bgcolor=#fefefe
| 130656 ||  || — || September 23, 2000 || Socorro || LINEAR || V || align=right | 1.4 km || 
|-id=657 bgcolor=#fefefe
| 130657 ||  || — || September 23, 2000 || Socorro || LINEAR || — || align=right | 1.8 km || 
|-id=658 bgcolor=#fefefe
| 130658 ||  || — || September 23, 2000 || Socorro || LINEAR || — || align=right | 1.6 km || 
|-id=659 bgcolor=#fefefe
| 130659 ||  || — || September 23, 2000 || Socorro || LINEAR || — || align=right | 1.5 km || 
|-id=660 bgcolor=#fefefe
| 130660 ||  || — || September 24, 2000 || Socorro || LINEAR || CLA || align=right | 2.4 km || 
|-id=661 bgcolor=#fefefe
| 130661 ||  || — || September 24, 2000 || Socorro || LINEAR || MAS || align=right | 1.4 km || 
|-id=662 bgcolor=#fefefe
| 130662 ||  || — || September 24, 2000 || Socorro || LINEAR || — || align=right | 1.8 km || 
|-id=663 bgcolor=#fefefe
| 130663 ||  || — || September 24, 2000 || Socorro || LINEAR || — || align=right | 1.8 km || 
|-id=664 bgcolor=#fefefe
| 130664 ||  || — || September 24, 2000 || Socorro || LINEAR || NYS || align=right | 1.4 km || 
|-id=665 bgcolor=#fefefe
| 130665 ||  || — || September 24, 2000 || Socorro || LINEAR || — || align=right | 1.6 km || 
|-id=666 bgcolor=#fefefe
| 130666 ||  || — || September 24, 2000 || Socorro || LINEAR || — || align=right | 1.4 km || 
|-id=667 bgcolor=#fefefe
| 130667 ||  || — || September 24, 2000 || Socorro || LINEAR || NYS || align=right | 1.3 km || 
|-id=668 bgcolor=#fefefe
| 130668 ||  || — || September 24, 2000 || Socorro || LINEAR || NYS || align=right | 3.4 km || 
|-id=669 bgcolor=#fefefe
| 130669 ||  || — || September 24, 2000 || Socorro || LINEAR || V || align=right | 1.4 km || 
|-id=670 bgcolor=#fefefe
| 130670 ||  || — || September 24, 2000 || Socorro || LINEAR || NYS || align=right | 1.4 km || 
|-id=671 bgcolor=#fefefe
| 130671 ||  || — || September 24, 2000 || Socorro || LINEAR || V || align=right | 1.4 km || 
|-id=672 bgcolor=#fefefe
| 130672 ||  || — || September 24, 2000 || Socorro || LINEAR || — || align=right | 1.4 km || 
|-id=673 bgcolor=#E9E9E9
| 130673 ||  || — || September 24, 2000 || Socorro || LINEAR || — || align=right | 1.4 km || 
|-id=674 bgcolor=#fefefe
| 130674 ||  || — || September 24, 2000 || Socorro || LINEAR || V || align=right | 1.7 km || 
|-id=675 bgcolor=#fefefe
| 130675 ||  || — || September 24, 2000 || Socorro || LINEAR || NYS || align=right | 1.4 km || 
|-id=676 bgcolor=#fefefe
| 130676 ||  || — || September 24, 2000 || Socorro || LINEAR || NYS || align=right | 2.8 km || 
|-id=677 bgcolor=#fefefe
| 130677 ||  || — || September 24, 2000 || Socorro || LINEAR || — || align=right | 1.6 km || 
|-id=678 bgcolor=#fefefe
| 130678 ||  || — || September 24, 2000 || Socorro || LINEAR || NYS || align=right | 4.4 km || 
|-id=679 bgcolor=#fefefe
| 130679 ||  || — || September 24, 2000 || Socorro || LINEAR || — || align=right | 1.5 km || 
|-id=680 bgcolor=#fefefe
| 130680 ||  || — || September 24, 2000 || Socorro || LINEAR || V || align=right | 1.5 km || 
|-id=681 bgcolor=#fefefe
| 130681 ||  || — || September 24, 2000 || Socorro || LINEAR || V || align=right | 1.5 km || 
|-id=682 bgcolor=#fefefe
| 130682 ||  || — || September 24, 2000 || Socorro || LINEAR || V || align=right | 1.8 km || 
|-id=683 bgcolor=#E9E9E9
| 130683 ||  || — || September 24, 2000 || Socorro || LINEAR || — || align=right | 2.8 km || 
|-id=684 bgcolor=#fefefe
| 130684 ||  || — || September 24, 2000 || Socorro || LINEAR || — || align=right | 1.4 km || 
|-id=685 bgcolor=#fefefe
| 130685 ||  || — || September 24, 2000 || Socorro || LINEAR || ERI || align=right | 4.7 km || 
|-id=686 bgcolor=#fefefe
| 130686 ||  || — || September 24, 2000 || Socorro || LINEAR || — || align=right | 1.6 km || 
|-id=687 bgcolor=#C2FFFF
| 130687 ||  || — || September 22, 2000 || Socorro || LINEAR || L5 || align=right | 18 km || 
|-id=688 bgcolor=#fefefe
| 130688 ||  || — || September 23, 2000 || Socorro || LINEAR || — || align=right | 1.8 km || 
|-id=689 bgcolor=#fefefe
| 130689 ||  || — || September 23, 2000 || Socorro || LINEAR || FLO || align=right | 1.8 km || 
|-id=690 bgcolor=#fefefe
| 130690 ||  || — || September 23, 2000 || Socorro || LINEAR || — || align=right | 4.3 km || 
|-id=691 bgcolor=#fefefe
| 130691 ||  || — || September 24, 2000 || Socorro || LINEAR || V || align=right | 1.5 km || 
|-id=692 bgcolor=#fefefe
| 130692 ||  || — || September 24, 2000 || Socorro || LINEAR || NYS || align=right | 1.2 km || 
|-id=693 bgcolor=#fefefe
| 130693 ||  || — || September 24, 2000 || Socorro || LINEAR || — || align=right | 1.9 km || 
|-id=694 bgcolor=#fefefe
| 130694 ||  || — || September 24, 2000 || Socorro || LINEAR || NYS || align=right | 1.2 km || 
|-id=695 bgcolor=#fefefe
| 130695 ||  || — || September 24, 2000 || Socorro || LINEAR || — || align=right | 1.4 km || 
|-id=696 bgcolor=#E9E9E9
| 130696 ||  || — || September 24, 2000 || Socorro || LINEAR || — || align=right | 3.8 km || 
|-id=697 bgcolor=#fefefe
| 130697 ||  || — || September 24, 2000 || Socorro || LINEAR || NYS || align=right | 1.0 km || 
|-id=698 bgcolor=#fefefe
| 130698 ||  || — || September 24, 2000 || Socorro || LINEAR || — || align=right | 1.2 km || 
|-id=699 bgcolor=#fefefe
| 130699 ||  || — || September 24, 2000 || Socorro || LINEAR || — || align=right | 1.6 km || 
|-id=700 bgcolor=#fefefe
| 130700 ||  || — || September 22, 2000 || Socorro || LINEAR || — || align=right | 2.9 km || 
|}

130701–130800 

|-bgcolor=#fefefe
| 130701 ||  || — || September 23, 2000 || Socorro || LINEAR || V || align=right | 1.5 km || 
|-id=702 bgcolor=#fefefe
| 130702 ||  || — || September 24, 2000 || Socorro || LINEAR || NYS || align=right | 1.6 km || 
|-id=703 bgcolor=#fefefe
| 130703 ||  || — || September 24, 2000 || Socorro || LINEAR || V || align=right | 1.3 km || 
|-id=704 bgcolor=#fefefe
| 130704 ||  || — || September 28, 2000 || Socorro || LINEAR || — || align=right | 1.8 km || 
|-id=705 bgcolor=#fefefe
| 130705 ||  || — || September 28, 2000 || Socorro || LINEAR || — || align=right | 2.3 km || 
|-id=706 bgcolor=#E9E9E9
| 130706 ||  || — || September 28, 2000 || Socorro || LINEAR || — || align=right | 4.1 km || 
|-id=707 bgcolor=#E9E9E9
| 130707 ||  || — || September 28, 2000 || Socorro || LINEAR || — || align=right | 3.0 km || 
|-id=708 bgcolor=#fefefe
| 130708 ||  || — || September 21, 2000 || Kitt Peak || Spacewatch || FLO || align=right | 1.2 km || 
|-id=709 bgcolor=#fefefe
| 130709 ||  || — || September 21, 2000 || Haleakala || NEAT || — || align=right | 2.2 km || 
|-id=710 bgcolor=#fefefe
| 130710 ||  || — || September 21, 2000 || Haleakala || NEAT || — || align=right | 1.8 km || 
|-id=711 bgcolor=#fefefe
| 130711 ||  || — || September 24, 2000 || Kitt Peak || Spacewatch || NYS || align=right | 1.5 km || 
|-id=712 bgcolor=#fefefe
| 130712 ||  || — || September 24, 2000 || Socorro || LINEAR || NYS || align=right | 1.2 km || 
|-id=713 bgcolor=#fefefe
| 130713 ||  || — || September 24, 2000 || Socorro || LINEAR || — || align=right | 1.4 km || 
|-id=714 bgcolor=#fefefe
| 130714 ||  || — || September 24, 2000 || Socorro || LINEAR || NYS || align=right | 1.6 km || 
|-id=715 bgcolor=#fefefe
| 130715 ||  || — || September 24, 2000 || Socorro || LINEAR || FLO || align=right | 1.6 km || 
|-id=716 bgcolor=#fefefe
| 130716 ||  || — || September 24, 2000 || Socorro || LINEAR || — || align=right | 1.3 km || 
|-id=717 bgcolor=#fefefe
| 130717 ||  || — || September 24, 2000 || Socorro || LINEAR || — || align=right | 1.5 km || 
|-id=718 bgcolor=#fefefe
| 130718 ||  || — || September 25, 2000 || Socorro || LINEAR || — || align=right | 1.9 km || 
|-id=719 bgcolor=#fefefe
| 130719 ||  || — || September 25, 2000 || Socorro || LINEAR || — || align=right | 1.8 km || 
|-id=720 bgcolor=#fefefe
| 130720 ||  || — || September 25, 2000 || Socorro || LINEAR || V || align=right | 1.1 km || 
|-id=721 bgcolor=#fefefe
| 130721 ||  || — || September 25, 2000 || Socorro || LINEAR || — || align=right | 1.8 km || 
|-id=722 bgcolor=#fefefe
| 130722 ||  || — || September 26, 2000 || Socorro || LINEAR || V || align=right | 1.3 km || 
|-id=723 bgcolor=#fefefe
| 130723 ||  || — || September 26, 2000 || Socorro || LINEAR || — || align=right | 1.7 km || 
|-id=724 bgcolor=#fefefe
| 130724 ||  || — || September 26, 2000 || Socorro || LINEAR || — || align=right | 2.2 km || 
|-id=725 bgcolor=#fefefe
| 130725 ||  || — || September 26, 2000 || Socorro || LINEAR || V || align=right | 1.2 km || 
|-id=726 bgcolor=#fefefe
| 130726 ||  || — || September 27, 2000 || Socorro || LINEAR || — || align=right | 1.5 km || 
|-id=727 bgcolor=#fefefe
| 130727 ||  || — || September 27, 2000 || Socorro || LINEAR || NYS || align=right | 1.4 km || 
|-id=728 bgcolor=#fefefe
| 130728 ||  || — || September 27, 2000 || Socorro || LINEAR || — || align=right | 1.7 km || 
|-id=729 bgcolor=#E9E9E9
| 130729 ||  || — || September 27, 2000 || Socorro || LINEAR || — || align=right | 1.6 km || 
|-id=730 bgcolor=#fefefe
| 130730 ||  || — || September 27, 2000 || Socorro || LINEAR || V || align=right | 1.3 km || 
|-id=731 bgcolor=#fefefe
| 130731 ||  || — || September 28, 2000 || Socorro || LINEAR || — || align=right | 1.4 km || 
|-id=732 bgcolor=#fefefe
| 130732 ||  || — || September 28, 2000 || Socorro || LINEAR || NYS || align=right | 1.2 km || 
|-id=733 bgcolor=#fefefe
| 130733 ||  || — || September 24, 2000 || Socorro || LINEAR || — || align=right | 2.5 km || 
|-id=734 bgcolor=#E9E9E9
| 130734 ||  || — || September 21, 2000 || Socorro || LINEAR || — || align=right | 2.3 km || 
|-id=735 bgcolor=#fefefe
| 130735 ||  || — || September 24, 2000 || Socorro || LINEAR || — || align=right | 2.1 km || 
|-id=736 bgcolor=#fefefe
| 130736 ||  || — || September 24, 2000 || Socorro || LINEAR || V || align=right | 1.6 km || 
|-id=737 bgcolor=#fefefe
| 130737 ||  || — || September 24, 2000 || Socorro || LINEAR || FLO || align=right | 1.3 km || 
|-id=738 bgcolor=#fefefe
| 130738 ||  || — || September 24, 2000 || Socorro || LINEAR || — || align=right | 3.5 km || 
|-id=739 bgcolor=#fefefe
| 130739 ||  || — || September 24, 2000 || Socorro || LINEAR || — || align=right | 1.8 km || 
|-id=740 bgcolor=#fefefe
| 130740 ||  || — || September 24, 2000 || Socorro || LINEAR || FLO || align=right | 1.4 km || 
|-id=741 bgcolor=#fefefe
| 130741 ||  || — || September 24, 2000 || Socorro || LINEAR || — || align=right | 1.3 km || 
|-id=742 bgcolor=#fefefe
| 130742 ||  || — || September 24, 2000 || Socorro || LINEAR || V || align=right | 1.7 km || 
|-id=743 bgcolor=#fefefe
| 130743 ||  || — || September 24, 2000 || Socorro || LINEAR || — || align=right | 2.3 km || 
|-id=744 bgcolor=#fefefe
| 130744 ||  || — || September 24, 2000 || Socorro || LINEAR || — || align=right | 1.9 km || 
|-id=745 bgcolor=#fefefe
| 130745 ||  || — || September 24, 2000 || Socorro || LINEAR || V || align=right | 1.5 km || 
|-id=746 bgcolor=#fefefe
| 130746 ||  || — || September 24, 2000 || Socorro || LINEAR || — || align=right | 1.4 km || 
|-id=747 bgcolor=#fefefe
| 130747 ||  || — || September 24, 2000 || Socorro || LINEAR || — || align=right | 1.5 km || 
|-id=748 bgcolor=#fefefe
| 130748 ||  || — || September 26, 2000 || Socorro || LINEAR || V || align=right | 1.1 km || 
|-id=749 bgcolor=#fefefe
| 130749 ||  || — || September 26, 2000 || Socorro || LINEAR || — || align=right | 1.6 km || 
|-id=750 bgcolor=#fefefe
| 130750 ||  || — || September 27, 2000 || Socorro || LINEAR || — || align=right | 1.6 km || 
|-id=751 bgcolor=#fefefe
| 130751 ||  || — || September 28, 2000 || Socorro || LINEAR || V || align=right | 1.2 km || 
|-id=752 bgcolor=#fefefe
| 130752 ||  || — || September 28, 2000 || Socorro || LINEAR || FLO || align=right | 1.4 km || 
|-id=753 bgcolor=#fefefe
| 130753 ||  || — || September 28, 2000 || Socorro || LINEAR || V || align=right | 1.3 km || 
|-id=754 bgcolor=#fefefe
| 130754 ||  || — || September 28, 2000 || Socorro || LINEAR || ERI || align=right | 2.8 km || 
|-id=755 bgcolor=#fefefe
| 130755 ||  || — || September 28, 2000 || Socorro || LINEAR || — || align=right | 1.9 km || 
|-id=756 bgcolor=#fefefe
| 130756 ||  || — || September 28, 2000 || Socorro || LINEAR || V || align=right | 1.4 km || 
|-id=757 bgcolor=#fefefe
| 130757 ||  || — || September 30, 2000 || Socorro || LINEAR || — || align=right | 1.7 km || 
|-id=758 bgcolor=#E9E9E9
| 130758 ||  || — || September 30, 2000 || Socorro || LINEAR || EUN || align=right | 2.9 km || 
|-id=759 bgcolor=#fefefe
| 130759 ||  || — || September 30, 2000 || Socorro || LINEAR || NYS || align=right | 1.4 km || 
|-id=760 bgcolor=#fefefe
| 130760 ||  || — || September 30, 2000 || Socorro || LINEAR || — || align=right | 3.2 km || 
|-id=761 bgcolor=#fefefe
| 130761 ||  || — || September 23, 2000 || Socorro || LINEAR || V || align=right | 1.3 km || 
|-id=762 bgcolor=#fefefe
| 130762 ||  || — || September 24, 2000 || Socorro || LINEAR || V || align=right | 1.3 km || 
|-id=763 bgcolor=#fefefe
| 130763 ||  || — || September 27, 2000 || Socorro || LINEAR || — || align=right | 1.5 km || 
|-id=764 bgcolor=#fefefe
| 130764 ||  || — || September 28, 2000 || Socorro || LINEAR || — || align=right | 1.7 km || 
|-id=765 bgcolor=#fefefe
| 130765 ||  || — || September 28, 2000 || Socorro || LINEAR || — || align=right | 1.4 km || 
|-id=766 bgcolor=#fefefe
| 130766 ||  || — || September 28, 2000 || Socorro || LINEAR || — || align=right | 1.9 km || 
|-id=767 bgcolor=#fefefe
| 130767 ||  || — || September 30, 2000 || Socorro || LINEAR || V || align=right | 1.5 km || 
|-id=768 bgcolor=#fefefe
| 130768 ||  || — || September 30, 2000 || Socorro || LINEAR || — || align=right | 1.9 km || 
|-id=769 bgcolor=#fefefe
| 130769 ||  || — || September 27, 2000 || Socorro || LINEAR || — || align=right | 2.7 km || 
|-id=770 bgcolor=#fefefe
| 130770 ||  || — || September 28, 2000 || Kitt Peak || Spacewatch || MAS || align=right | 1.4 km || 
|-id=771 bgcolor=#fefefe
| 130771 ||  || — || September 28, 2000 || Kitt Peak || Spacewatch || PHO || align=right | 2.8 km || 
|-id=772 bgcolor=#fefefe
| 130772 ||  || — || September 29, 2000 || Kitt Peak || Spacewatch || — || align=right | 1.7 km || 
|-id=773 bgcolor=#fefefe
| 130773 ||  || — || September 29, 2000 || Kitt Peak || Spacewatch || V || align=right | 1.3 km || 
|-id=774 bgcolor=#fefefe
| 130774 ||  || — || September 27, 2000 || Socorro || LINEAR || NYS || align=right | 1.1 km || 
|-id=775 bgcolor=#fefefe
| 130775 ||  || — || September 26, 2000 || Haleakala || NEAT || — || align=right | 1.4 km || 
|-id=776 bgcolor=#fefefe
| 130776 ||  || — || September 21, 2000 || Socorro || LINEAR || CIM || align=right | 5.0 km || 
|-id=777 bgcolor=#fefefe
| 130777 ||  || — || September 20, 2000 || Socorro || LINEAR || — || align=right | 1.6 km || 
|-id=778 bgcolor=#fefefe
| 130778 ||  || — || September 24, 2000 || Anderson Mesa || LONEOS || V || align=right | 1.5 km || 
|-id=779 bgcolor=#E9E9E9
| 130779 ||  || — || October 3, 2000 || Prescott || P. G. Comba || ADE || align=right | 4.2 km || 
|-id=780 bgcolor=#fefefe
| 130780 ||  || — || October 1, 2000 || Socorro || LINEAR || V || align=right | 1.2 km || 
|-id=781 bgcolor=#fefefe
| 130781 ||  || — || October 1, 2000 || Socorro || LINEAR || MAS || align=right | 1.3 km || 
|-id=782 bgcolor=#fefefe
| 130782 ||  || — || October 1, 2000 || Socorro || LINEAR || MAS || align=right | 1.4 km || 
|-id=783 bgcolor=#fefefe
| 130783 ||  || — || October 1, 2000 || Socorro || LINEAR || — || align=right | 1.5 km || 
|-id=784 bgcolor=#fefefe
| 130784 ||  || — || October 1, 2000 || Socorro || LINEAR || FLO || align=right | 1.2 km || 
|-id=785 bgcolor=#fefefe
| 130785 ||  || — || October 1, 2000 || Socorro || LINEAR || V || align=right | 1.4 km || 
|-id=786 bgcolor=#E9E9E9
| 130786 ||  || — || October 1, 2000 || Socorro || LINEAR || — || align=right | 1.6 km || 
|-id=787 bgcolor=#E9E9E9
| 130787 ||  || — || October 1, 2000 || Socorro || LINEAR || — || align=right | 1.3 km || 
|-id=788 bgcolor=#E9E9E9
| 130788 ||  || — || October 1, 2000 || Socorro || LINEAR || — || align=right | 1.6 km || 
|-id=789 bgcolor=#fefefe
| 130789 ||  || — || October 1, 2000 || Socorro || LINEAR || V || align=right | 1.3 km || 
|-id=790 bgcolor=#fefefe
| 130790 ||  || — || October 1, 2000 || Socorro || LINEAR || FLO || align=right | 1.1 km || 
|-id=791 bgcolor=#fefefe
| 130791 ||  || — || October 2, 2000 || Socorro || LINEAR || — || align=right | 1.9 km || 
|-id=792 bgcolor=#E9E9E9
| 130792 ||  || — || October 3, 2000 || Socorro || LINEAR || — || align=right | 2.2 km || 
|-id=793 bgcolor=#fefefe
| 130793 ||  || — || October 4, 2000 || Kitt Peak || Spacewatch || — || align=right | 1.4 km || 
|-id=794 bgcolor=#fefefe
| 130794 ||  || — || October 6, 2000 || Anderson Mesa || LONEOS || — || align=right | 1.8 km || 
|-id=795 bgcolor=#fefefe
| 130795 ||  || — || October 1, 2000 || Socorro || LINEAR || — || align=right | 1.7 km || 
|-id=796 bgcolor=#fefefe
| 130796 ||  || — || October 1, 2000 || Socorro || LINEAR || V || align=right | 1.5 km || 
|-id=797 bgcolor=#fefefe
| 130797 ||  || — || October 1, 2000 || Socorro || LINEAR || — || align=right | 1.9 km || 
|-id=798 bgcolor=#fefefe
| 130798 ||  || — || October 1, 2000 || Socorro || LINEAR || — || align=right | 1.4 km || 
|-id=799 bgcolor=#fefefe
| 130799 ||  || — || October 1, 2000 || Socorro || LINEAR || — || align=right | 1.6 km || 
|-id=800 bgcolor=#fefefe
| 130800 ||  || — || October 1, 2000 || Socorro || LINEAR || — || align=right | 1.6 km || 
|}

130801–130900 

|-bgcolor=#E9E9E9
| 130801 ||  || — || October 1, 2000 || Socorro || LINEAR || — || align=right | 3.1 km || 
|-id=802 bgcolor=#fefefe
| 130802 ||  || — || October 1, 2000 || Socorro || LINEAR || — || align=right | 1.8 km || 
|-id=803 bgcolor=#fefefe
| 130803 ||  || — || October 1, 2000 || Socorro || LINEAR || — || align=right | 1.5 km || 
|-id=804 bgcolor=#fefefe
| 130804 ||  || — || October 1, 2000 || Socorro || LINEAR || — || align=right | 4.4 km || 
|-id=805 bgcolor=#E9E9E9
| 130805 ||  || — || October 2, 2000 || Socorro || LINEAR || — || align=right | 2.1 km || 
|-id=806 bgcolor=#fefefe
| 130806 ||  || — || October 1, 2000 || Socorro || LINEAR || V || align=right | 1.5 km || 
|-id=807 bgcolor=#fefefe
| 130807 ||  || — || October 3, 2000 || Socorro || LINEAR || — || align=right | 1.9 km || 
|-id=808 bgcolor=#fefefe
| 130808 || 2000 UU || — || October 21, 2000 || Višnjan Observatory || K. Korlević || FLO || align=right | 1.3 km || 
|-id=809 bgcolor=#fefefe
| 130809 ||  || — || October 24, 2000 || Socorro || LINEAR || slow || align=right | 2.0 km || 
|-id=810 bgcolor=#fefefe
| 130810 ||  || — || October 24, 2000 || Socorro || LINEAR || — || align=right | 1.5 km || 
|-id=811 bgcolor=#fefefe
| 130811 ||  || — || October 24, 2000 || Socorro || LINEAR || FLO || align=right | 1.2 km || 
|-id=812 bgcolor=#E9E9E9
| 130812 ||  || — || October 24, 2000 || Socorro || LINEAR || — || align=right | 2.0 km || 
|-id=813 bgcolor=#fefefe
| 130813 ||  || — || October 24, 2000 || Socorro || LINEAR || — || align=right | 1.9 km || 
|-id=814 bgcolor=#E9E9E9
| 130814 ||  || — || October 24, 2000 || Socorro || LINEAR || EUN || align=right | 3.2 km || 
|-id=815 bgcolor=#fefefe
| 130815 ||  || — || October 24, 2000 || Socorro || LINEAR || — || align=right | 2.7 km || 
|-id=816 bgcolor=#fefefe
| 130816 ||  || — || October 24, 2000 || Socorro || LINEAR || MAS || align=right | 1.7 km || 
|-id=817 bgcolor=#fefefe
| 130817 ||  || — || October 24, 2000 || Socorro || LINEAR || NYS || align=right | 1.4 km || 
|-id=818 bgcolor=#fefefe
| 130818 ||  || — || October 23, 2000 || Višnjan Observatory || K. Korlević || — || align=right | 2.4 km || 
|-id=819 bgcolor=#E9E9E9
| 130819 ||  || — || October 25, 2000 || Socorro || LINEAR || JUN || align=right | 1.3 km || 
|-id=820 bgcolor=#fefefe
| 130820 ||  || — || October 24, 2000 || Socorro || LINEAR || V || align=right | 1.4 km || 
|-id=821 bgcolor=#fefefe
| 130821 ||  || — || October 29, 2000 || Kitt Peak || Spacewatch || — || align=right | 1.4 km || 
|-id=822 bgcolor=#fefefe
| 130822 ||  || — || October 24, 2000 || Socorro || LINEAR || — || align=right | 1.3 km || 
|-id=823 bgcolor=#E9E9E9
| 130823 ||  || — || October 24, 2000 || Socorro || LINEAR || — || align=right | 1.9 km || 
|-id=824 bgcolor=#fefefe
| 130824 ||  || — || October 24, 2000 || Socorro || LINEAR || — || align=right | 3.9 km || 
|-id=825 bgcolor=#fefefe
| 130825 ||  || — || October 24, 2000 || Socorro || LINEAR || — || align=right | 1.9 km || 
|-id=826 bgcolor=#fefefe
| 130826 ||  || — || October 30, 2000 || Socorro || LINEAR || NYS || align=right | 1.3 km || 
|-id=827 bgcolor=#E9E9E9
| 130827 ||  || — || October 24, 2000 || Socorro || LINEAR || — || align=right | 2.0 km || 
|-id=828 bgcolor=#fefefe
| 130828 ||  || — || October 24, 2000 || Socorro || LINEAR || NYS || align=right | 1.3 km || 
|-id=829 bgcolor=#fefefe
| 130829 ||  || — || October 24, 2000 || Socorro || LINEAR || NYS || align=right | 1.2 km || 
|-id=830 bgcolor=#fefefe
| 130830 ||  || — || October 24, 2000 || Socorro || LINEAR || V || align=right | 1.4 km || 
|-id=831 bgcolor=#fefefe
| 130831 ||  || — || October 24, 2000 || Socorro || LINEAR || MAS || align=right | 1.3 km || 
|-id=832 bgcolor=#E9E9E9
| 130832 ||  || — || October 24, 2000 || Socorro || LINEAR || — || align=right | 2.1 km || 
|-id=833 bgcolor=#fefefe
| 130833 ||  || — || October 24, 2000 || Socorro || LINEAR || — || align=right | 1.5 km || 
|-id=834 bgcolor=#fefefe
| 130834 ||  || — || October 24, 2000 || Socorro || LINEAR || EUT || align=right | 1.1 km || 
|-id=835 bgcolor=#fefefe
| 130835 ||  || — || October 24, 2000 || Socorro || LINEAR || — || align=right | 1.2 km || 
|-id=836 bgcolor=#fefefe
| 130836 ||  || — || October 24, 2000 || Socorro || LINEAR || FLO || align=right | 1.2 km || 
|-id=837 bgcolor=#E9E9E9
| 130837 ||  || — || October 24, 2000 || Socorro || LINEAR || RAF || align=right | 2.4 km || 
|-id=838 bgcolor=#fefefe
| 130838 ||  || — || October 24, 2000 || Socorro || LINEAR || — || align=right | 1.5 km || 
|-id=839 bgcolor=#E9E9E9
| 130839 ||  || — || October 24, 2000 || Socorro || LINEAR || — || align=right | 2.3 km || 
|-id=840 bgcolor=#fefefe
| 130840 ||  || — || October 24, 2000 || Socorro || LINEAR || NYS || align=right | 1.3 km || 
|-id=841 bgcolor=#fefefe
| 130841 ||  || — || October 24, 2000 || Socorro || LINEAR || — || align=right | 1.5 km || 
|-id=842 bgcolor=#fefefe
| 130842 ||  || — || October 24, 2000 || Socorro || LINEAR || — || align=right | 1.4 km || 
|-id=843 bgcolor=#fefefe
| 130843 ||  || — || October 25, 2000 || Socorro || LINEAR || NYS || align=right | 1.1 km || 
|-id=844 bgcolor=#E9E9E9
| 130844 ||  || — || October 25, 2000 || Socorro || LINEAR || EUN || align=right | 2.1 km || 
|-id=845 bgcolor=#fefefe
| 130845 ||  || — || October 25, 2000 || Socorro || LINEAR || — || align=right | 2.7 km || 
|-id=846 bgcolor=#fefefe
| 130846 ||  || — || October 25, 2000 || Socorro || LINEAR || — || align=right | 2.1 km || 
|-id=847 bgcolor=#E9E9E9
| 130847 ||  || — || October 25, 2000 || Socorro || LINEAR || GEF || align=right | 1.3 km || 
|-id=848 bgcolor=#fefefe
| 130848 ||  || — || October 25, 2000 || Socorro || LINEAR || — || align=right | 1.4 km || 
|-id=849 bgcolor=#fefefe
| 130849 ||  || — || October 25, 2000 || Socorro || LINEAR || — || align=right | 1.8 km || 
|-id=850 bgcolor=#fefefe
| 130850 ||  || — || October 25, 2000 || Socorro || LINEAR || V || align=right | 1.3 km || 
|-id=851 bgcolor=#fefefe
| 130851 ||  || — || October 25, 2000 || Socorro || LINEAR || NYS || align=right data-sort-value="0.99" | 990 m || 
|-id=852 bgcolor=#fefefe
| 130852 ||  || — || October 25, 2000 || Socorro || LINEAR || FLO || align=right | 1.2 km || 
|-id=853 bgcolor=#fefefe
| 130853 ||  || — || October 25, 2000 || Socorro || LINEAR || — || align=right | 2.0 km || 
|-id=854 bgcolor=#E9E9E9
| 130854 ||  || — || October 25, 2000 || Socorro || LINEAR || — || align=right | 1.7 km || 
|-id=855 bgcolor=#fefefe
| 130855 ||  || — || October 26, 2000 || Socorro || LINEAR || V || align=right | 1.5 km || 
|-id=856 bgcolor=#fefefe
| 130856 ||  || — || October 26, 2000 || Socorro || LINEAR || — || align=right | 1.9 km || 
|-id=857 bgcolor=#E9E9E9
| 130857 ||  || — || October 23, 2000 || Višnjan Observatory || K. Korlević || — || align=right | 2.0 km || 
|-id=858 bgcolor=#fefefe
| 130858 ||  || — || October 24, 2000 || Socorro || LINEAR || — || align=right | 2.3 km || 
|-id=859 bgcolor=#E9E9E9
| 130859 ||  || — || October 24, 2000 || Socorro || LINEAR || — || align=right | 3.8 km || 
|-id=860 bgcolor=#fefefe
| 130860 ||  || — || October 30, 2000 || Socorro || LINEAR || — || align=right | 2.0 km || 
|-id=861 bgcolor=#fefefe
| 130861 ||  || — || October 31, 2000 || Socorro || LINEAR || V || align=right | 1.1 km || 
|-id=862 bgcolor=#fefefe
| 130862 ||  || — || October 31, 2000 || Socorro || LINEAR || — || align=right | 1.7 km || 
|-id=863 bgcolor=#fefefe
| 130863 ||  || — || October 25, 2000 || Socorro || LINEAR || V || align=right | 1.8 km || 
|-id=864 bgcolor=#E9E9E9
| 130864 ||  || — || October 25, 2000 || Socorro || LINEAR || EUN || align=right | 3.3 km || 
|-id=865 bgcolor=#fefefe
| 130865 ||  || — || October 30, 2000 || Socorro || LINEAR || — || align=right | 1.2 km || 
|-id=866 bgcolor=#E9E9E9
| 130866 ||  || — || October 31, 2000 || Socorro || LINEAR || — || align=right | 4.4 km || 
|-id=867 bgcolor=#E9E9E9
| 130867 ||  || — || October 25, 2000 || Socorro || LINEAR || — || align=right | 3.0 km || 
|-id=868 bgcolor=#E9E9E9
| 130868 || 2000 VZ || — || November 1, 2000 || Kitt Peak || Spacewatch || — || align=right | 1.6 km || 
|-id=869 bgcolor=#E9E9E9
| 130869 ||  || — || November 1, 2000 || Socorro || LINEAR || — || align=right | 2.8 km || 
|-id=870 bgcolor=#E9E9E9
| 130870 ||  || — || November 1, 2000 || Socorro || LINEAR || — || align=right | 2.7 km || 
|-id=871 bgcolor=#E9E9E9
| 130871 ||  || — || November 1, 2000 || Socorro || LINEAR || — || align=right | 3.3 km || 
|-id=872 bgcolor=#E9E9E9
| 130872 ||  || — || November 1, 2000 || Ondřejov || P. Kušnirák || — || align=right | 1.8 km || 
|-id=873 bgcolor=#fefefe
| 130873 ||  || — || November 1, 2000 || Ondřejov || P. Pravec, P. Kušnirák || — || align=right | 1.5 km || 
|-id=874 bgcolor=#fefefe
| 130874 ||  || — || November 1, 2000 || Desert Beaver || W. K. Y. Yeung || NYS || align=right | 1.3 km || 
|-id=875 bgcolor=#fefefe
| 130875 ||  || — || November 1, 2000 || Socorro || LINEAR || V || align=right | 1.5 km || 
|-id=876 bgcolor=#fefefe
| 130876 ||  || — || November 1, 2000 || Socorro || LINEAR || — || align=right | 1.6 km || 
|-id=877 bgcolor=#fefefe
| 130877 ||  || — || November 1, 2000 || Socorro || LINEAR || — || align=right | 1.6 km || 
|-id=878 bgcolor=#fefefe
| 130878 ||  || — || November 1, 2000 || Socorro || LINEAR || V || align=right | 1.4 km || 
|-id=879 bgcolor=#fefefe
| 130879 ||  || — || November 1, 2000 || Socorro || LINEAR || — || align=right | 1.5 km || 
|-id=880 bgcolor=#fefefe
| 130880 ||  || — || November 1, 2000 || Socorro || LINEAR || NYS || align=right | 1.7 km || 
|-id=881 bgcolor=#fefefe
| 130881 ||  || — || November 1, 2000 || Socorro || LINEAR || V || align=right | 1.4 km || 
|-id=882 bgcolor=#fefefe
| 130882 ||  || — || November 1, 2000 || Socorro || LINEAR || NYS || align=right | 1.2 km || 
|-id=883 bgcolor=#fefefe
| 130883 ||  || — || November 1, 2000 || Socorro || LINEAR || — || align=right | 1.1 km || 
|-id=884 bgcolor=#fefefe
| 130884 ||  || — || November 1, 2000 || Socorro || LINEAR || — || align=right | 1.7 km || 
|-id=885 bgcolor=#fefefe
| 130885 ||  || — || November 1, 2000 || Socorro || LINEAR || — || align=right | 1.9 km || 
|-id=886 bgcolor=#E9E9E9
| 130886 ||  || — || November 1, 2000 || Socorro || LINEAR || — || align=right | 2.0 km || 
|-id=887 bgcolor=#E9E9E9
| 130887 ||  || — || November 1, 2000 || Socorro || LINEAR || — || align=right | 1.7 km || 
|-id=888 bgcolor=#fefefe
| 130888 ||  || — || November 1, 2000 || Socorro || LINEAR || NYS || align=right | 1.3 km || 
|-id=889 bgcolor=#fefefe
| 130889 ||  || — || November 1, 2000 || Socorro || LINEAR || NYS || align=right | 1.3 km || 
|-id=890 bgcolor=#fefefe
| 130890 ||  || — || November 1, 2000 || Socorro || LINEAR || — || align=right | 1.9 km || 
|-id=891 bgcolor=#E9E9E9
| 130891 ||  || — || November 1, 2000 || Socorro || LINEAR || — || align=right | 2.3 km || 
|-id=892 bgcolor=#fefefe
| 130892 ||  || — || November 1, 2000 || Socorro || LINEAR || V || align=right | 1.2 km || 
|-id=893 bgcolor=#fefefe
| 130893 ||  || — || November 1, 2000 || Socorro || LINEAR || NYS || align=right | 1.0 km || 
|-id=894 bgcolor=#E9E9E9
| 130894 ||  || — || November 1, 2000 || Socorro || LINEAR || — || align=right | 2.1 km || 
|-id=895 bgcolor=#fefefe
| 130895 ||  || — || November 1, 2000 || Socorro || LINEAR || — || align=right | 1.6 km || 
|-id=896 bgcolor=#E9E9E9
| 130896 ||  || — || November 1, 2000 || Socorro || LINEAR || — || align=right | 2.5 km || 
|-id=897 bgcolor=#fefefe
| 130897 ||  || — || November 1, 2000 || Socorro || LINEAR || FLO || align=right | 1.4 km || 
|-id=898 bgcolor=#fefefe
| 130898 ||  || — || November 1, 2000 || Socorro || LINEAR || V || align=right | 1.4 km || 
|-id=899 bgcolor=#fefefe
| 130899 ||  || — || November 1, 2000 || Socorro || LINEAR || NYS || align=right | 1.2 km || 
|-id=900 bgcolor=#fefefe
| 130900 ||  || — || November 1, 2000 || Socorro || LINEAR || NYS || align=right | 1.9 km || 
|}

130901–131000 

|-bgcolor=#E9E9E9
| 130901 ||  || — || November 1, 2000 || Socorro || LINEAR || — || align=right | 4.7 km || 
|-id=902 bgcolor=#fefefe
| 130902 ||  || — || November 1, 2000 || Socorro || LINEAR || — || align=right | 1.8 km || 
|-id=903 bgcolor=#E9E9E9
| 130903 ||  || — || November 1, 2000 || Socorro || LINEAR || — || align=right | 3.2 km || 
|-id=904 bgcolor=#E9E9E9
| 130904 ||  || — || November 2, 2000 || Socorro || LINEAR || BAR || align=right | 2.8 km || 
|-id=905 bgcolor=#fefefe
| 130905 ||  || — || November 1, 2000 || Socorro || LINEAR || — || align=right | 3.3 km || 
|-id=906 bgcolor=#fefefe
| 130906 ||  || — || November 1, 2000 || Socorro || LINEAR || — || align=right | 1.8 km || 
|-id=907 bgcolor=#E9E9E9
| 130907 ||  || — || November 2, 2000 || Socorro || LINEAR || MIT || align=right | 3.2 km || 
|-id=908 bgcolor=#fefefe
| 130908 ||  || — || November 1, 2000 || Socorro || LINEAR || — || align=right | 2.0 km || 
|-id=909 bgcolor=#E9E9E9
| 130909 ||  || — || November 3, 2000 || Socorro || LINEAR || KON || align=right | 3.5 km || 
|-id=910 bgcolor=#E9E9E9
| 130910 ||  || — || November 3, 2000 || Socorro || LINEAR || — || align=right | 2.1 km || 
|-id=911 bgcolor=#fefefe
| 130911 ||  || — || November 3, 2000 || Socorro || LINEAR || V || align=right | 1.4 km || 
|-id=912 bgcolor=#fefefe
| 130912 ||  || — || November 3, 2000 || Socorro || LINEAR || NYS || align=right | 1.5 km || 
|-id=913 bgcolor=#E9E9E9
| 130913 ||  || — || November 6, 2000 || Socorro || LINEAR || HNS || align=right | 2.7 km || 
|-id=914 bgcolor=#fefefe
| 130914 || 2000 WY || — || November 17, 2000 || Kitt Peak || Spacewatch || V || align=right | 1.2 km || 
|-id=915 bgcolor=#E9E9E9
| 130915 ||  || — || November 18, 2000 || Desert Beaver || W. K. Y. Yeung || — || align=right | 2.5 km || 
|-id=916 bgcolor=#E9E9E9
| 130916 ||  || — || November 19, 2000 || Socorro || LINEAR || HNS || align=right | 3.0 km || 
|-id=917 bgcolor=#fefefe
| 130917 ||  || — || November 20, 2000 || Socorro || LINEAR || — || align=right | 2.0 km || 
|-id=918 bgcolor=#E9E9E9
| 130918 ||  || — || November 20, 2000 || Socorro || LINEAR || — || align=right | 2.5 km || 
|-id=919 bgcolor=#E9E9E9
| 130919 ||  || — || November 20, 2000 || Socorro || LINEAR || — || align=right | 2.8 km || 
|-id=920 bgcolor=#E9E9E9
| 130920 ||  || — || November 24, 2000 || Elmira || A. J. Cecce || — || align=right | 2.8 km || 
|-id=921 bgcolor=#E9E9E9
| 130921 ||  || — || November 20, 2000 || Socorro || LINEAR || ADE || align=right | 4.0 km || 
|-id=922 bgcolor=#E9E9E9
| 130922 ||  || — || November 20, 2000 || Socorro || LINEAR || — || align=right | 2.2 km || 
|-id=923 bgcolor=#E9E9E9
| 130923 ||  || — || November 21, 2000 || Socorro || LINEAR || — || align=right | 1.4 km || 
|-id=924 bgcolor=#fefefe
| 130924 ||  || — || November 21, 2000 || Socorro || LINEAR || — || align=right | 1.7 km || 
|-id=925 bgcolor=#E9E9E9
| 130925 ||  || — || November 21, 2000 || Socorro || LINEAR || — || align=right | 2.3 km || 
|-id=926 bgcolor=#E9E9E9
| 130926 ||  || — || November 25, 2000 || Fountain Hills || C. W. Juels || MIT || align=right | 5.8 km || 
|-id=927 bgcolor=#E9E9E9
| 130927 ||  || — || November 20, 2000 || Socorro || LINEAR || — || align=right | 1.7 km || 
|-id=928 bgcolor=#fefefe
| 130928 ||  || — || November 21, 2000 || Socorro || LINEAR || V || align=right | 1.3 km || 
|-id=929 bgcolor=#E9E9E9
| 130929 ||  || — || November 21, 2000 || Socorro || LINEAR || — || align=right | 2.6 km || 
|-id=930 bgcolor=#fefefe
| 130930 ||  || — || November 25, 2000 || Socorro || LINEAR || V || align=right | 1.2 km || 
|-id=931 bgcolor=#E9E9E9
| 130931 ||  || — || November 20, 2000 || Socorro || LINEAR || — || align=right | 4.6 km || 
|-id=932 bgcolor=#fefefe
| 130932 ||  || — || November 21, 2000 || Socorro || LINEAR || PHO || align=right | 2.3 km || 
|-id=933 bgcolor=#E9E9E9
| 130933 ||  || — || November 20, 2000 || Socorro || LINEAR || — || align=right | 3.8 km || 
|-id=934 bgcolor=#E9E9E9
| 130934 ||  || — || November 20, 2000 || Socorro || LINEAR || — || align=right | 2.0 km || 
|-id=935 bgcolor=#E9E9E9
| 130935 ||  || — || November 20, 2000 || Socorro || LINEAR || — || align=right | 2.0 km || 
|-id=936 bgcolor=#E9E9E9
| 130936 ||  || — || November 20, 2000 || Socorro || LINEAR || — || align=right | 4.2 km || 
|-id=937 bgcolor=#E9E9E9
| 130937 ||  || — || November 20, 2000 || Socorro || LINEAR || — || align=right | 3.0 km || 
|-id=938 bgcolor=#E9E9E9
| 130938 ||  || — || November 20, 2000 || Socorro || LINEAR || — || align=right | 2.6 km || 
|-id=939 bgcolor=#E9E9E9
| 130939 ||  || — || November 20, 2000 || Socorro || LINEAR || — || align=right | 4.3 km || 
|-id=940 bgcolor=#E9E9E9
| 130940 ||  || — || November 21, 2000 || Socorro || LINEAR || — || align=right | 4.0 km || 
|-id=941 bgcolor=#E9E9E9
| 130941 ||  || — || November 21, 2000 || Socorro || LINEAR || — || align=right | 1.8 km || 
|-id=942 bgcolor=#fefefe
| 130942 ||  || — || November 26, 2000 || Socorro || LINEAR || V || align=right | 1.1 km || 
|-id=943 bgcolor=#fefefe
| 130943 ||  || — || November 27, 2000 || Kitt Peak || Spacewatch || MAS || align=right | 2.4 km || 
|-id=944 bgcolor=#fefefe
| 130944 ||  || — || November 20, 2000 || Socorro || LINEAR || FLO || align=right | 1.7 km || 
|-id=945 bgcolor=#E9E9E9
| 130945 ||  || — || November 20, 2000 || Socorro || LINEAR || — || align=right | 3.1 km || 
|-id=946 bgcolor=#E9E9E9
| 130946 ||  || — || November 21, 2000 || Socorro || LINEAR || — || align=right | 2.1 km || 
|-id=947 bgcolor=#E9E9E9
| 130947 ||  || — || November 20, 2000 || Anderson Mesa || LONEOS || HNS || align=right | 2.0 km || 
|-id=948 bgcolor=#E9E9E9
| 130948 ||  || — || November 20, 2000 || Socorro || LINEAR || — || align=right | 3.5 km || 
|-id=949 bgcolor=#fefefe
| 130949 ||  || — || November 21, 2000 || Socorro || LINEAR || FLO || align=right | 1.6 km || 
|-id=950 bgcolor=#fefefe
| 130950 ||  || — || November 20, 2000 || Socorro || LINEAR || — || align=right | 1.8 km || 
|-id=951 bgcolor=#fefefe
| 130951 ||  || — || November 20, 2000 || Socorro || LINEAR || — || align=right | 1.7 km || 
|-id=952 bgcolor=#fefefe
| 130952 ||  || — || November 20, 2000 || Socorro || LINEAR || V || align=right | 1.6 km || 
|-id=953 bgcolor=#E9E9E9
| 130953 ||  || — || November 20, 2000 || Socorro || LINEAR || fast? || align=right | 1.6 km || 
|-id=954 bgcolor=#E9E9E9
| 130954 ||  || — || November 20, 2000 || Socorro || LINEAR || — || align=right | 1.9 km || 
|-id=955 bgcolor=#E9E9E9
| 130955 ||  || — || November 21, 2000 || Socorro || LINEAR || — || align=right | 2.8 km || 
|-id=956 bgcolor=#E9E9E9
| 130956 ||  || — || November 21, 2000 || Socorro || LINEAR || VIB || align=right | 4.2 km || 
|-id=957 bgcolor=#E9E9E9
| 130957 ||  || — || November 21, 2000 || Socorro || LINEAR || — || align=right | 1.8 km || 
|-id=958 bgcolor=#E9E9E9
| 130958 ||  || — || November 21, 2000 || Socorro || LINEAR || — || align=right | 2.0 km || 
|-id=959 bgcolor=#fefefe
| 130959 ||  || — || November 21, 2000 || Socorro || LINEAR || NYS || align=right | 1.2 km || 
|-id=960 bgcolor=#fefefe
| 130960 ||  || — || November 21, 2000 || Socorro || LINEAR || NYS || align=right | 2.0 km || 
|-id=961 bgcolor=#E9E9E9
| 130961 ||  || — || November 21, 2000 || Socorro || LINEAR || — || align=right | 2.3 km || 
|-id=962 bgcolor=#fefefe
| 130962 ||  || — || November 21, 2000 || Socorro || LINEAR || MAS || align=right | 1.1 km || 
|-id=963 bgcolor=#E9E9E9
| 130963 ||  || — || November 21, 2000 || Socorro || LINEAR || ADE || align=right | 6.3 km || 
|-id=964 bgcolor=#fefefe
| 130964 ||  || — || November 26, 2000 || Socorro || LINEAR || — || align=right | 3.5 km || 
|-id=965 bgcolor=#E9E9E9
| 130965 ||  || — || November 29, 2000 || Haleakala || NEAT || — || align=right | 1.4 km || 
|-id=966 bgcolor=#fefefe
| 130966 ||  || — || November 20, 2000 || Socorro || LINEAR || V || align=right | 1.2 km || 
|-id=967 bgcolor=#E9E9E9
| 130967 ||  || — || November 20, 2000 || Socorro || LINEAR || — || align=right | 2.2 km || 
|-id=968 bgcolor=#E9E9E9
| 130968 ||  || — || November 20, 2000 || Socorro || LINEAR || — || align=right | 2.5 km || 
|-id=969 bgcolor=#E9E9E9
| 130969 ||  || — || November 20, 2000 || Socorro || LINEAR || — || align=right | 2.8 km || 
|-id=970 bgcolor=#fefefe
| 130970 ||  || — || November 20, 2000 || Socorro || LINEAR || NYS || align=right | 1.3 km || 
|-id=971 bgcolor=#fefefe
| 130971 ||  || — || November 20, 2000 || Socorro || LINEAR || NYS || align=right | 4.9 km || 
|-id=972 bgcolor=#fefefe
| 130972 ||  || — || November 20, 2000 || Socorro || LINEAR || — || align=right | 2.6 km || 
|-id=973 bgcolor=#fefefe
| 130973 ||  || — || November 20, 2000 || Socorro || LINEAR || NYS || align=right | 1.3 km || 
|-id=974 bgcolor=#fefefe
| 130974 ||  || — || November 20, 2000 || Socorro || LINEAR || — || align=right | 1.7 km || 
|-id=975 bgcolor=#E9E9E9
| 130975 ||  || — || November 20, 2000 || Socorro || LINEAR || EUN || align=right | 2.2 km || 
|-id=976 bgcolor=#E9E9E9
| 130976 ||  || — || November 20, 2000 || Socorro || LINEAR || — || align=right | 2.0 km || 
|-id=977 bgcolor=#E9E9E9
| 130977 ||  || — || November 29, 2000 || Socorro || LINEAR || — || align=right | 1.8 km || 
|-id=978 bgcolor=#fefefe
| 130978 ||  || — || November 29, 2000 || Socorro || LINEAR || — || align=right | 2.1 km || 
|-id=979 bgcolor=#fefefe
| 130979 ||  || — || November 30, 2000 || Socorro || LINEAR || — || align=right | 2.1 km || 
|-id=980 bgcolor=#E9E9E9
| 130980 ||  || — || November 30, 2000 || Socorro || LINEAR || — || align=right | 4.1 km || 
|-id=981 bgcolor=#fefefe
| 130981 ||  || — || November 16, 2000 || Kitt Peak || Spacewatch || — || align=right | 2.0 km || 
|-id=982 bgcolor=#E9E9E9
| 130982 ||  || — || November 19, 2000 || Kitt Peak || Spacewatch || MIS || align=right | 4.1 km || 
|-id=983 bgcolor=#fefefe
| 130983 ||  || — || November 20, 2000 || Anderson Mesa || LONEOS || — || align=right | 2.0 km || 
|-id=984 bgcolor=#E9E9E9
| 130984 ||  || — || November 19, 2000 || Socorro || LINEAR || ADE || align=right | 2.8 km || 
|-id=985 bgcolor=#fefefe
| 130985 ||  || — || November 19, 2000 || Socorro || LINEAR || — || align=right | 2.6 km || 
|-id=986 bgcolor=#fefefe
| 130986 ||  || — || November 21, 2000 || Socorro || LINEAR || MAS || align=right | 1.1 km || 
|-id=987 bgcolor=#fefefe
| 130987 ||  || — || November 21, 2000 || Socorro || LINEAR || — || align=right | 2.2 km || 
|-id=988 bgcolor=#fefefe
| 130988 ||  || — || November 19, 2000 || Socorro || LINEAR || — || align=right | 3.0 km || 
|-id=989 bgcolor=#E9E9E9
| 130989 ||  || — || November 20, 2000 || Anderson Mesa || LONEOS || — || align=right | 2.6 km || 
|-id=990 bgcolor=#fefefe
| 130990 ||  || — || November 29, 2000 || Socorro || LINEAR || NYS || align=right | 1.5 km || 
|-id=991 bgcolor=#E9E9E9
| 130991 ||  || — || November 30, 2000 || Socorro || LINEAR || — || align=right | 3.0 km || 
|-id=992 bgcolor=#fefefe
| 130992 ||  || — || November 20, 2000 || Anderson Mesa || LONEOS || — || align=right | 4.2 km || 
|-id=993 bgcolor=#E9E9E9
| 130993 ||  || — || November 20, 2000 || Anderson Mesa || LONEOS || — || align=right | 2.3 km || 
|-id=994 bgcolor=#E9E9E9
| 130994 ||  || — || November 20, 2000 || Anderson Mesa || LONEOS || — || align=right | 2.0 km || 
|-id=995 bgcolor=#fefefe
| 130995 ||  || — || November 24, 2000 || Anderson Mesa || LONEOS || — || align=right | 1.4 km || 
|-id=996 bgcolor=#fefefe
| 130996 ||  || — || November 24, 2000 || Anderson Mesa || LONEOS || — || align=right | 1.9 km || 
|-id=997 bgcolor=#fefefe
| 130997 ||  || — || November 24, 2000 || Anderson Mesa || LONEOS || — || align=right | 1.3 km || 
|-id=998 bgcolor=#fefefe
| 130998 ||  || — || November 24, 2000 || Anderson Mesa || LONEOS || V || align=right | 1.6 km || 
|-id=999 bgcolor=#fefefe
| 130999 ||  || — || November 25, 2000 || Socorro || LINEAR || PHO || align=right | 2.3 km || 
|-id=000 bgcolor=#E9E9E9
| 131000 ||  || — || November 28, 2000 || Kitt Peak || Spacewatch || — || align=right | 2.5 km || 
|}

References

External links 
 Discovery Circumstances: Numbered Minor Planets (130001)–(135000) (IAU Minor Planet Center)

0130